

323001–323100 

|-bgcolor=#fefefe
| 323001 ||  || — || August 8, 2002 || Palomar || NEAT || — || align=right data-sort-value="0.91" | 910 m || 
|-id=002 bgcolor=#d6d6d6
| 323002 ||  || — || August 9, 2002 || Socorro || LINEAR || — || align=right | 3.4 km || 
|-id=003 bgcolor=#fefefe
| 323003 ||  || — || August 6, 2002 || Palomar || NEAT || — || align=right data-sort-value="0.72" | 720 m || 
|-id=004 bgcolor=#d6d6d6
| 323004 ||  || — || August 12, 2002 || Socorro || LINEAR || — || align=right | 3.7 km || 
|-id=005 bgcolor=#d6d6d6
| 323005 ||  || — || August 12, 2002 || Socorro || LINEAR || — || align=right | 3.4 km || 
|-id=006 bgcolor=#fefefe
| 323006 ||  || — || August 13, 2002 || Socorro || LINEAR || — || align=right | 1.4 km || 
|-id=007 bgcolor=#fefefe
| 323007 ||  || — || August 14, 2002 || Anderson Mesa || LONEOS || — || align=right | 1.2 km || 
|-id=008 bgcolor=#fefefe
| 323008 ||  || — || August 14, 2002 || Socorro || LINEAR || — || align=right | 1.2 km || 
|-id=009 bgcolor=#fefefe
| 323009 ||  || — || August 6, 2002 || Palomar || NEAT || — || align=right data-sort-value="0.83" | 830 m || 
|-id=010 bgcolor=#d6d6d6
| 323010 ||  || — || August 14, 2002 || Socorro || LINEAR || — || align=right | 4.2 km || 
|-id=011 bgcolor=#d6d6d6
| 323011 ||  || — || August 12, 2002 || Cerro Tololo || M. W. Buie || — || align=right | 3.7 km || 
|-id=012 bgcolor=#fefefe
| 323012 ||  || — || August 8, 2002 || Palomar || S. F. Hönig || — || align=right data-sort-value="0.71" | 710 m || 
|-id=013 bgcolor=#d6d6d6
| 323013 ||  || — || August 8, 2002 || Palomar || S. F. Hönig || — || align=right | 2.7 km || 
|-id=014 bgcolor=#E9E9E9
| 323014 ||  || — || August 8, 2002 || Palomar || NEAT || — || align=right | 1.0 km || 
|-id=015 bgcolor=#d6d6d6
| 323015 ||  || — || August 8, 2002 || Palomar || NEAT || — || align=right | 3.6 km || 
|-id=016 bgcolor=#fefefe
| 323016 ||  || — || August 8, 2002 || Palomar || NEAT || FLO || align=right data-sort-value="0.77" | 770 m || 
|-id=017 bgcolor=#fefefe
| 323017 ||  || — || August 8, 2002 || Palomar || NEAT || NYS || align=right data-sort-value="0.54" | 540 m || 
|-id=018 bgcolor=#fefefe
| 323018 ||  || — || August 11, 2002 || Palomar || NEAT || — || align=right data-sort-value="0.89" | 890 m || 
|-id=019 bgcolor=#fefefe
| 323019 ||  || — || August 11, 2002 || Palomar || NEAT || V || align=right data-sort-value="0.82" | 820 m || 
|-id=020 bgcolor=#fefefe
| 323020 ||  || — || January 11, 2008 || Kitt Peak || Spacewatch || — || align=right data-sort-value="0.82" | 820 m || 
|-id=021 bgcolor=#d6d6d6
| 323021 ||  || — || August 15, 2002 || Palomar || NEAT || SYL7:4 || align=right | 4.4 km || 
|-id=022 bgcolor=#fefefe
| 323022 ||  || — || August 16, 2002 || Haleakala || NEAT || — || align=right data-sort-value="0.92" | 920 m || 
|-id=023 bgcolor=#fefefe
| 323023 ||  || — || August 27, 2002 || Palomar || NEAT || — || align=right data-sort-value="0.99" | 990 m || 
|-id=024 bgcolor=#d6d6d6
| 323024 ||  || — || August 28, 2002 || Palomar || NEAT || THM || align=right | 2.8 km || 
|-id=025 bgcolor=#fefefe
| 323025 ||  || — || August 29, 2002 || Palomar || NEAT || V || align=right data-sort-value="0.82" | 820 m || 
|-id=026 bgcolor=#fefefe
| 323026 ||  || — || August 31, 2002 || Palomar || NEAT || — || align=right | 1.2 km || 
|-id=027 bgcolor=#d6d6d6
| 323027 ||  || — || August 29, 2002 || Palomar || NEAT || ALA || align=right | 5.7 km || 
|-id=028 bgcolor=#fefefe
| 323028 ||  || — || August 29, 2002 || Palomar || NEAT || — || align=right | 1.1 km || 
|-id=029 bgcolor=#d6d6d6
| 323029 ||  || — || August 18, 2002 || Palomar || NEAT || HYG || align=right | 2.8 km || 
|-id=030 bgcolor=#fefefe
| 323030 ||  || — || August 17, 2002 || Palomar || NEAT || — || align=right data-sort-value="0.86" | 860 m || 
|-id=031 bgcolor=#fefefe
| 323031 ||  || — || August 17, 2002 || Palomar || NEAT || NYS || align=right data-sort-value="0.66" | 660 m || 
|-id=032 bgcolor=#fefefe
| 323032 ||  || — || August 17, 2002 || Palomar || NEAT || — || align=right data-sort-value="0.93" | 930 m || 
|-id=033 bgcolor=#d6d6d6
| 323033 ||  || — || August 18, 2002 || Palomar || NEAT || 7:4 || align=right | 4.1 km || 
|-id=034 bgcolor=#fefefe
| 323034 ||  || — || August 17, 2002 || Palomar || NEAT || — || align=right data-sort-value="0.99" | 990 m || 
|-id=035 bgcolor=#fefefe
| 323035 ||  || — || January 11, 2008 || Kitt Peak || Spacewatch || V || align=right data-sort-value="0.65" | 650 m || 
|-id=036 bgcolor=#d6d6d6
| 323036 ||  || — || September 2, 2002 || Palomar || NEAT || — || align=right | 3.6 km || 
|-id=037 bgcolor=#fefefe
| 323037 ||  || — || September 4, 2002 || Anderson Mesa || LONEOS || — || align=right | 1.1 km || 
|-id=038 bgcolor=#d6d6d6
| 323038 ||  || — || September 4, 2002 || Anderson Mesa || LONEOS || THM || align=right | 3.2 km || 
|-id=039 bgcolor=#d6d6d6
| 323039 ||  || — || September 3, 2002 || Haleakala || NEAT || — || align=right | 4.1 km || 
|-id=040 bgcolor=#fefefe
| 323040 ||  || — || September 4, 2002 || Anderson Mesa || LONEOS || — || align=right | 1.0 km || 
|-id=041 bgcolor=#fefefe
| 323041 ||  || — || September 4, 2002 || Anderson Mesa || LONEOS || LCI || align=right | 1.0 km || 
|-id=042 bgcolor=#fefefe
| 323042 ||  || — || September 5, 2002 || Socorro || LINEAR || NYS || align=right data-sort-value="0.79" | 790 m || 
|-id=043 bgcolor=#fefefe
| 323043 ||  || — || September 5, 2002 || Anderson Mesa || LONEOS || V || align=right data-sort-value="0.96" | 960 m || 
|-id=044 bgcolor=#d6d6d6
| 323044 ||  || — || September 3, 2002 || Palomar || NEAT || — || align=right | 7.4 km || 
|-id=045 bgcolor=#fefefe
| 323045 ||  || — || September 5, 2002 || Socorro || LINEAR || — || align=right | 1.1 km || 
|-id=046 bgcolor=#fefefe
| 323046 ||  || — || September 5, 2002 || Socorro || LINEAR || ERI || align=right | 2.1 km || 
|-id=047 bgcolor=#fefefe
| 323047 ||  || — || September 12, 2002 || Haleakala || NEAT || — || align=right | 1.3 km || 
|-id=048 bgcolor=#FA8072
| 323048 ||  || — || September 11, 2002 || Palomar || NEAT || — || align=right data-sort-value="0.69" | 690 m || 
|-id=049 bgcolor=#fefefe
| 323049 ||  || — || September 13, 2002 || Palomar || NEAT || — || align=right data-sort-value="0.98" | 980 m || 
|-id=050 bgcolor=#fefefe
| 323050 ||  || — || September 14, 2002 || Kitt Peak || Spacewatch || FLO || align=right data-sort-value="0.74" | 740 m || 
|-id=051 bgcolor=#fefefe
| 323051 ||  || — || September 14, 2002 || Palomar || NEAT || NYS || align=right data-sort-value="0.65" | 650 m || 
|-id=052 bgcolor=#fefefe
| 323052 ||  || — || September 13, 2002 || Socorro || LINEAR || — || align=right | 1.2 km || 
|-id=053 bgcolor=#d6d6d6
| 323053 ||  || — || September 12, 2002 || Palomar || NEAT || — || align=right | 3.4 km || 
|-id=054 bgcolor=#fefefe
| 323054 ||  || — || September 12, 2002 || Palomar || NEAT || NYS || align=right data-sort-value="0.66" | 660 m || 
|-id=055 bgcolor=#fefefe
| 323055 ||  || — || September 13, 2002 || Socorro || LINEAR || NYS || align=right data-sort-value="0.73" | 730 m || 
|-id=056 bgcolor=#fefefe
| 323056 ||  || — || September 15, 2002 || Palomar || NEAT || NYS || align=right data-sort-value="0.81" | 810 m || 
|-id=057 bgcolor=#fefefe
| 323057 ||  || — || September 14, 2002 || Palomar || NEAT || — || align=right | 2.7 km || 
|-id=058 bgcolor=#fefefe
| 323058 ||  || — || September 4, 2002 || Palomar || NEAT || — || align=right data-sort-value="0.78" | 780 m || 
|-id=059 bgcolor=#fefefe
| 323059 ||  || — || September 27, 2002 || Palomar || NEAT || V || align=right data-sort-value="0.83" | 830 m || 
|-id=060 bgcolor=#E9E9E9
| 323060 ||  || — || September 28, 2002 || Haleakala || NEAT || — || align=right data-sort-value="0.86" | 860 m || 
|-id=061 bgcolor=#fefefe
| 323061 ||  || — || September 30, 2002 || Socorro || LINEAR || NYS || align=right data-sort-value="0.75" | 750 m || 
|-id=062 bgcolor=#fefefe
| 323062 ||  || — || September 30, 2002 || Haleakala || NEAT || — || align=right | 1.0 km || 
|-id=063 bgcolor=#fefefe
| 323063 ||  || — || September 29, 2002 || Kitt Peak || Spacewatch || — || align=right | 2.2 km || 
|-id=064 bgcolor=#fefefe
| 323064 ||  || — || September 16, 2002 || Palomar || NEAT || — || align=right data-sort-value="0.83" | 830 m || 
|-id=065 bgcolor=#d6d6d6
| 323065 ||  || — || September 16, 2002 || Palomar || NEAT || — || align=right | 3.8 km || 
|-id=066 bgcolor=#fefefe
| 323066 ||  || — || October 1, 2002 || Anderson Mesa || LONEOS || — || align=right data-sort-value="0.95" | 950 m || 
|-id=067 bgcolor=#fefefe
| 323067 ||  || — || October 2, 2002 || Socorro || LINEAR || — || align=right data-sort-value="0.87" | 870 m || 
|-id=068 bgcolor=#d6d6d6
| 323068 ||  || — || October 2, 2002 || Socorro || LINEAR || 7:4 || align=right | 5.4 km || 
|-id=069 bgcolor=#fefefe
| 323069 ||  || — || October 3, 2002 || Socorro || LINEAR || H || align=right data-sort-value="0.63" | 630 m || 
|-id=070 bgcolor=#fefefe
| 323070 ||  || — || October 1, 2002 || Haleakala || NEAT || PHO || align=right | 1.9 km || 
|-id=071 bgcolor=#fefefe
| 323071 ||  || — || October 3, 2002 || Palomar || NEAT || V || align=right data-sort-value="0.94" | 940 m || 
|-id=072 bgcolor=#fefefe
| 323072 ||  || — || October 3, 2002 || Socorro || LINEAR || — || align=right data-sort-value="0.94" | 940 m || 
|-id=073 bgcolor=#fefefe
| 323073 ||  || — || October 4, 2002 || Palomar || NEAT || H || align=right data-sort-value="0.68" | 680 m || 
|-id=074 bgcolor=#fefefe
| 323074 ||  || — || October 10, 2002 || Uccle || Uccle Obs. || NYS || align=right data-sort-value="0.91" | 910 m || 
|-id=075 bgcolor=#fefefe
| 323075 ||  || — || October 4, 2002 || Socorro || LINEAR || — || align=right | 1.2 km || 
|-id=076 bgcolor=#fefefe
| 323076 ||  || — || October 4, 2002 || Palomar || NEAT || — || align=right data-sort-value="0.91" | 910 m || 
|-id=077 bgcolor=#E9E9E9
| 323077 ||  || — || October 3, 2002 || Palomar || NEAT || EUN || align=right | 1.5 km || 
|-id=078 bgcolor=#fefefe
| 323078 ||  || — || October 3, 2002 || Palomar || NEAT || — || align=right | 1.1 km || 
|-id=079 bgcolor=#fefefe
| 323079 ||  || — || October 4, 2002 || Palomar || NEAT || — || align=right | 1.4 km || 
|-id=080 bgcolor=#E9E9E9
| 323080 ||  || — || October 4, 2002 || Socorro || LINEAR || EUN || align=right | 1.4 km || 
|-id=081 bgcolor=#fefefe
| 323081 ||  || — || October 4, 2002 || Socorro || LINEAR || — || align=right | 1.2 km || 
|-id=082 bgcolor=#fefefe
| 323082 ||  || — || October 4, 2002 || Palomar || NEAT || — || align=right | 1.0 km || 
|-id=083 bgcolor=#fefefe
| 323083 ||  || — || October 9, 2002 || Kitt Peak || Spacewatch || 417 || align=right data-sort-value="0.96" | 960 m || 
|-id=084 bgcolor=#fefefe
| 323084 ||  || — || October 10, 2002 || Socorro || LINEAR || H || align=right data-sort-value="0.75" | 750 m || 
|-id=085 bgcolor=#fefefe
| 323085 ||  || — || October 5, 2002 || Apache Point || SDSS || — || align=right data-sort-value="0.94" | 940 m || 
|-id=086 bgcolor=#fefefe
| 323086 ||  || — || October 5, 2002 || Apache Point || SDSS || — || align=right data-sort-value="0.80" | 800 m || 
|-id=087 bgcolor=#fefefe
| 323087 ||  || — || February 1, 2008 || Mount Lemmon || Mount Lemmon Survey || V || align=right data-sort-value="0.92" | 920 m || 
|-id=088 bgcolor=#fefefe
| 323088 ||  || — || October 29, 2002 || Apache Point || SDSS || — || align=right | 1.0 km || 
|-id=089 bgcolor=#FA8072
| 323089 ||  || — || November 5, 2002 || Socorro || LINEAR || — || align=right | 1.3 km || 
|-id=090 bgcolor=#E9E9E9
| 323090 ||  || — || November 5, 2002 || Socorro || LINEAR || — || align=right | 1.0 km || 
|-id=091 bgcolor=#E9E9E9
| 323091 ||  || — || November 5, 2002 || Socorro || LINEAR || — || align=right data-sort-value="0.94" | 940 m || 
|-id=092 bgcolor=#E9E9E9
| 323092 ||  || — || November 5, 2002 || Socorro || LINEAR || — || align=right | 1.8 km || 
|-id=093 bgcolor=#fefefe
| 323093 ||  || — || November 5, 2002 || Palomar || NEAT || NYS || align=right data-sort-value="0.82" | 820 m || 
|-id=094 bgcolor=#E9E9E9
| 323094 ||  || — || November 5, 2002 || Palomar || NEAT || — || align=right | 1.4 km || 
|-id=095 bgcolor=#FA8072
| 323095 ||  || — || November 7, 2002 || Socorro || LINEAR || — || align=right | 1.9 km || 
|-id=096 bgcolor=#fefefe
| 323096 ||  || — || November 11, 2002 || Kvistaberg || UDAS || — || align=right | 1.3 km || 
|-id=097 bgcolor=#E9E9E9
| 323097 ||  || — || November 13, 2002 || Palomar || NEAT || — || align=right | 2.6 km || 
|-id=098 bgcolor=#fefefe
| 323098 ||  || — || May 14, 2005 || Mount Lemmon || Mount Lemmon Survey || — || align=right data-sort-value="0.85" | 850 m || 
|-id=099 bgcolor=#fefefe
| 323099 ||  || — || November 24, 2002 || Palomar || NEAT || — || align=right | 1.1 km || 
|-id=100 bgcolor=#fefefe
| 323100 ||  || — || November 24, 2002 || Palomar || NEAT || — || align=right | 1.1 km || 
|}

323101–323200 

|-bgcolor=#E9E9E9
| 323101 ||  || — || December 2, 2002 || Socorro || LINEAR || — || align=right | 2.4 km || 
|-id=102 bgcolor=#E9E9E9
| 323102 ||  || — || December 2, 2002 || Haleakala || NEAT || — || align=right | 1.1 km || 
|-id=103 bgcolor=#E9E9E9
| 323103 ||  || — || December 5, 2002 || Socorro || LINEAR || — || align=right data-sort-value="0.95" | 950 m || 
|-id=104 bgcolor=#E9E9E9
| 323104 ||  || — || December 5, 2002 || Haleakala || NEAT || — || align=right | 1.5 km || 
|-id=105 bgcolor=#E9E9E9
| 323105 ||  || — || December 27, 2002 || Anderson Mesa || LONEOS || IAN || align=right | 1.1 km || 
|-id=106 bgcolor=#E9E9E9
| 323106 ||  || — || December 28, 2002 || Anderson Mesa || LONEOS || — || align=right | 2.8 km || 
|-id=107 bgcolor=#E9E9E9
| 323107 ||  || — || December 30, 2002 || Bohyunsan || Y.-B. Jeon, B.-C. Lee || — || align=right data-sort-value="0.99" | 990 m || 
|-id=108 bgcolor=#E9E9E9
| 323108 ||  || — || December 31, 2002 || Socorro || LINEAR || MAR || align=right | 1.8 km || 
|-id=109 bgcolor=#E9E9E9
| 323109 ||  || — || December 31, 2002 || Socorro || LINEAR || EUN || align=right | 1.5 km || 
|-id=110 bgcolor=#E9E9E9
| 323110 ||  || — || December 31, 2002 || Socorro || LINEAR || — || align=right | 1.9 km || 
|-id=111 bgcolor=#E9E9E9
| 323111 ||  || — || December 31, 2002 || Socorro || LINEAR || — || align=right | 1.7 km || 
|-id=112 bgcolor=#E9E9E9
| 323112 ||  || — || December 31, 2002 || Socorro || LINEAR || — || align=right | 2.5 km || 
|-id=113 bgcolor=#E9E9E9
| 323113 ||  || — || January 1, 2003 || Socorro || LINEAR || JUN || align=right | 1.5 km || 
|-id=114 bgcolor=#E9E9E9
| 323114 ||  || — || January 1, 2003 || Socorro || LINEAR || — || align=right | 2.0 km || 
|-id=115 bgcolor=#E9E9E9
| 323115 ||  || — || January 4, 2003 || Socorro || LINEAR || — || align=right | 2.4 km || 
|-id=116 bgcolor=#E9E9E9
| 323116 ||  || — || January 4, 2003 || Socorro || LINEAR || — || align=right | 1.4 km || 
|-id=117 bgcolor=#E9E9E9
| 323117 ||  || — || January 5, 2003 || Socorro || LINEAR || — || align=right | 1.2 km || 
|-id=118 bgcolor=#E9E9E9
| 323118 ||  || — || January 7, 2003 || Socorro || LINEAR || — || align=right | 1.7 km || 
|-id=119 bgcolor=#E9E9E9
| 323119 ||  || — || January 7, 2003 || Socorro || LINEAR || — || align=right | 1.9 km || 
|-id=120 bgcolor=#E9E9E9
| 323120 ||  || — || January 5, 2003 || Socorro || LINEAR || ADE || align=right | 3.4 km || 
|-id=121 bgcolor=#E9E9E9
| 323121 ||  || — || January 5, 2003 || Socorro || LINEAR || IAN || align=right | 1.6 km || 
|-id=122 bgcolor=#E9E9E9
| 323122 ||  || — || January 7, 2003 || Socorro || LINEAR || — || align=right | 1.2 km || 
|-id=123 bgcolor=#E9E9E9
| 323123 ||  || — || January 8, 2003 || Socorro || LINEAR || — || align=right | 2.1 km || 
|-id=124 bgcolor=#E9E9E9
| 323124 ||  || — || January 10, 2003 || Kitt Peak || Spacewatch || — || align=right | 1.2 km || 
|-id=125 bgcolor=#E9E9E9
| 323125 ||  || — || January 10, 2003 || Socorro || LINEAR || RAF || align=right | 1.6 km || 
|-id=126 bgcolor=#E9E9E9
| 323126 ||  || — || January 24, 2003 || La Silla || A. Boattini, H. Scholl || — || align=right | 1.9 km || 
|-id=127 bgcolor=#E9E9E9
| 323127 ||  || — || January 26, 2003 || Haleakala || NEAT || RAF || align=right | 1.5 km || 
|-id=128 bgcolor=#E9E9E9
| 323128 ||  || — || January 27, 2003 || Palomar || NEAT || — || align=right | 2.2 km || 
|-id=129 bgcolor=#E9E9E9
| 323129 ||  || — || January 25, 2003 || Palomar || NEAT || JUN || align=right | 1.1 km || 
|-id=130 bgcolor=#E9E9E9
| 323130 ||  || — || January 27, 2003 || Socorro || LINEAR || — || align=right | 1.5 km || 
|-id=131 bgcolor=#E9E9E9
| 323131 ||  || — || January 27, 2003 || Haleakala || NEAT || MIS || align=right | 2.7 km || 
|-id=132 bgcolor=#E9E9E9
| 323132 ||  || — || January 28, 2003 || Kitt Peak || Spacewatch || — || align=right | 2.1 km || 
|-id=133 bgcolor=#E9E9E9
| 323133 ||  || — || January 28, 2003 || Socorro || LINEAR || JUN || align=right | 1.7 km || 
|-id=134 bgcolor=#E9E9E9
| 323134 ||  || — || January 29, 2003 || Palomar || NEAT || — || align=right | 1.5 km || 
|-id=135 bgcolor=#E9E9E9
| 323135 ||  || — || January 29, 2003 || Palomar || NEAT || — || align=right | 2.6 km || 
|-id=136 bgcolor=#E9E9E9
| 323136 ||  || — || January 29, 2003 || Palomar || NEAT || — || align=right | 1.8 km || 
|-id=137 bgcolor=#d6d6d6
| 323137 ||  || — || January 31, 2003 || Anderson Mesa || LONEOS ||  || align=right | 10 km || 
|-id=138 bgcolor=#E9E9E9
| 323138 ||  || — || January 26, 2003 || Palomar || NEAT || — || align=right | 1.7 km || 
|-id=139 bgcolor=#E9E9E9
| 323139 ||  || — || February 1, 2003 || Socorro || LINEAR || IAN || align=right | 1.5 km || 
|-id=140 bgcolor=#E9E9E9
| 323140 ||  || — || February 1, 2003 || Socorro || LINEAR || — || align=right | 1.6 km || 
|-id=141 bgcolor=#E9E9E9
| 323141 ||  || — || February 22, 2003 || Desert Eagle || W. K. Y. Yeung || — || align=right | 2.5 km || 
|-id=142 bgcolor=#E9E9E9
| 323142 ||  || — || February 22, 2003 || Palomar || NEAT || — || align=right | 2.4 km || 
|-id=143 bgcolor=#E9E9E9
| 323143 ||  || — || February 26, 2003 || Socorro || LINEAR || — || align=right | 4.3 km || 
|-id=144 bgcolor=#E9E9E9
| 323144 ||  || — || February 27, 2003 || Haleakala || NEAT || — || align=right | 2.8 km || 
|-id=145 bgcolor=#E9E9E9
| 323145 ||  || — || September 28, 2001 || Palomar || NEAT || — || align=right | 2.5 km || 
|-id=146 bgcolor=#E9E9E9
| 323146 ||  || — || March 7, 2003 || Socorro || LINEAR || — || align=right | 2.6 km || 
|-id=147 bgcolor=#E9E9E9
| 323147 ||  || — || March 6, 2003 || Anderson Mesa || LONEOS || — || align=right | 3.1 km || 
|-id=148 bgcolor=#E9E9E9
| 323148 ||  || — || February 23, 2003 || Anderson Mesa || LONEOS || — || align=right | 1.4 km || 
|-id=149 bgcolor=#E9E9E9
| 323149 ||  || — || March 8, 2003 || Socorro || LINEAR || — || align=right | 2.6 km || 
|-id=150 bgcolor=#E9E9E9
| 323150 ||  || — || March 10, 2003 || Palomar || NEAT || — || align=right | 2.8 km || 
|-id=151 bgcolor=#E9E9E9
| 323151 ||  || — || March 12, 2003 || Palomar || NEAT || — || align=right | 2.9 km || 
|-id=152 bgcolor=#E9E9E9
| 323152 ||  || — || March 9, 2003 || Palomar || NEAT || EUN || align=right | 1.6 km || 
|-id=153 bgcolor=#E9E9E9
| 323153 ||  || — || March 9, 2003 || Palomar || NEAT || — || align=right | 2.1 km || 
|-id=154 bgcolor=#E9E9E9
| 323154 ||  || — || March 22, 2003 || Palomar || NEAT || HNS || align=right | 1.6 km || 
|-id=155 bgcolor=#E9E9E9
| 323155 ||  || — || March 23, 2003 || Palomar || NEAT || — || align=right | 2.6 km || 
|-id=156 bgcolor=#E9E9E9
| 323156 ||  || — || March 23, 2003 || Palomar || NEAT || JUN || align=right | 1.3 km || 
|-id=157 bgcolor=#E9E9E9
| 323157 ||  || — || March 24, 2003 || Kitt Peak || Spacewatch || — || align=right | 2.3 km || 
|-id=158 bgcolor=#E9E9E9
| 323158 ||  || — || March 24, 2003 || Haleakala || NEAT || — || align=right | 3.1 km || 
|-id=159 bgcolor=#E9E9E9
| 323159 ||  || — || March 25, 2003 || Palomar || NEAT || — || align=right | 2.2 km || 
|-id=160 bgcolor=#E9E9E9
| 323160 ||  || — || March 26, 2003 || Palomar || NEAT || — || align=right | 2.5 km || 
|-id=161 bgcolor=#E9E9E9
| 323161 ||  || — || March 26, 2003 || Kitt Peak || Spacewatch || GEF || align=right | 2.0 km || 
|-id=162 bgcolor=#E9E9E9
| 323162 ||  || — || March 26, 2003 || Kitt Peak || Spacewatch || EUN || align=right | 1.4 km || 
|-id=163 bgcolor=#E9E9E9
| 323163 ||  || — || March 10, 2003 || Anderson Mesa || LONEOS || — || align=right | 1.6 km || 
|-id=164 bgcolor=#E9E9E9
| 323164 ||  || — || March 29, 2003 || Anderson Mesa || LONEOS || — || align=right | 2.9 km || 
|-id=165 bgcolor=#E9E9E9
| 323165 ||  || — || March 29, 2003 || Anderson Mesa || LONEOS || — || align=right | 2.9 km || 
|-id=166 bgcolor=#E9E9E9
| 323166 ||  || — || March 29, 2003 || Anderson Mesa || LONEOS || — || align=right | 4.0 km || 
|-id=167 bgcolor=#E9E9E9
| 323167 ||  || — || March 30, 2003 || Anderson Mesa || LONEOS || — || align=right | 2.2 km || 
|-id=168 bgcolor=#E9E9E9
| 323168 ||  || — || March 25, 2003 || Palomar || NEAT || MAR || align=right | 1.4 km || 
|-id=169 bgcolor=#E9E9E9
| 323169 ||  || — || March 31, 2003 || Kitt Peak || Spacewatch || — || align=right | 2.5 km || 
|-id=170 bgcolor=#E9E9E9
| 323170 ||  || — || April 1, 2003 || Socorro || LINEAR || JUN || align=right | 1.8 km || 
|-id=171 bgcolor=#E9E9E9
| 323171 ||  || — || April 2, 2003 || Haleakala || NEAT || MAR || align=right | 1.6 km || 
|-id=172 bgcolor=#E9E9E9
| 323172 ||  || — || April 2, 2003 || Haleakala || NEAT || — || align=right | 2.2 km || 
|-id=173 bgcolor=#E9E9E9
| 323173 ||  || — || April 1, 2003 || Socorro || LINEAR || — || align=right | 5.0 km || 
|-id=174 bgcolor=#E9E9E9
| 323174 ||  || — || April 5, 2003 || Kitt Peak || Spacewatch || — || align=right | 2.1 km || 
|-id=175 bgcolor=#E9E9E9
| 323175 ||  || — || April 3, 2003 || Anderson Mesa || LONEOS || CLO || align=right | 3.2 km || 
|-id=176 bgcolor=#E9E9E9
| 323176 ||  || — || April 5, 2003 || Kitt Peak || Spacewatch || INO || align=right | 1.3 km || 
|-id=177 bgcolor=#E9E9E9
| 323177 ||  || — || April 4, 2003 || Kitt Peak || Spacewatch || — || align=right | 3.5 km || 
|-id=178 bgcolor=#E9E9E9
| 323178 ||  || — || April 23, 2003 || Campo Imperatore || CINEOS || — || align=right | 4.2 km || 
|-id=179 bgcolor=#FFC2E0
| 323179 ||  || — || April 29, 2003 || Haleakala || NEAT || APO +1km || align=right | 1.2 km || 
|-id=180 bgcolor=#E9E9E9
| 323180 ||  || — || April 28, 2003 || Socorro || LINEAR || — || align=right | 3.4 km || 
|-id=181 bgcolor=#E9E9E9
| 323181 ||  || — || May 27, 2003 || Kitt Peak || Spacewatch || GEF || align=right | 1.4 km || 
|-id=182 bgcolor=#FA8072
| 323182 ||  || — || June 26, 2003 || Socorro || LINEAR || PHO || align=right | 1.6 km || 
|-id=183 bgcolor=#fefefe
| 323183 ||  || — || April 21, 1993 || Kitt Peak || Spacewatch || — || align=right data-sort-value="0.70" | 700 m || 
|-id=184 bgcolor=#E9E9E9
| 323184 ||  || — || July 5, 2003 || Haleakala || NEAT || — || align=right | 3.4 km || 
|-id=185 bgcolor=#d6d6d6
| 323185 ||  || — || July 4, 2003 || Kitt Peak || Spacewatch || — || align=right | 3.9 km || 
|-id=186 bgcolor=#d6d6d6
| 323186 ||  || — || July 24, 2003 || Wise || Wise Obs. || EOS || align=right | 2.8 km || 
|-id=187 bgcolor=#d6d6d6
| 323187 ||  || — || July 24, 2003 || Palomar || NEAT || TIR || align=right | 3.9 km || 
|-id=188 bgcolor=#fefefe
| 323188 ||  || — || July 25, 2003 || Palomar || NEAT || FLO || align=right | 1.3 km || 
|-id=189 bgcolor=#fefefe
| 323189 ||  || — || August 19, 2003 || Campo Imperatore || CINEOS || — || align=right | 1.0 km || 
|-id=190 bgcolor=#d6d6d6
| 323190 ||  || — || August 21, 2003 || Socorro || LINEAR || ALA || align=right | 5.6 km || 
|-id=191 bgcolor=#d6d6d6
| 323191 ||  || — || August 20, 2003 || Palomar || NEAT || — || align=right | 3.1 km || 
|-id=192 bgcolor=#d6d6d6
| 323192 ||  || — || August 20, 2003 || Campo Imperatore || CINEOS || — || align=right | 3.8 km || 
|-id=193 bgcolor=#d6d6d6
| 323193 ||  || — || August 22, 2003 || Socorro || LINEAR || — || align=right | 5.5 km || 
|-id=194 bgcolor=#fefefe
| 323194 ||  || — || July 23, 2003 || Palomar || NEAT || — || align=right data-sort-value="0.93" | 930 m || 
|-id=195 bgcolor=#d6d6d6
| 323195 ||  || — || August 21, 2003 || Palomar || NEAT || ALA || align=right | 4.3 km || 
|-id=196 bgcolor=#fefefe
| 323196 ||  || — || August 25, 2003 || Socorro || LINEAR || FLO || align=right data-sort-value="0.82" | 820 m || 
|-id=197 bgcolor=#d6d6d6
| 323197 ||  || — || August 23, 2003 || Palomar || NEAT || — || align=right | 4.3 km || 
|-id=198 bgcolor=#fefefe
| 323198 ||  || — || August 24, 2003 || Socorro || LINEAR || — || align=right data-sort-value="0.77" | 770 m || 
|-id=199 bgcolor=#d6d6d6
| 323199 ||  || — || August 24, 2003 || Socorro || LINEAR || — || align=right | 3.7 km || 
|-id=200 bgcolor=#fefefe
| 323200 ||  || — || August 29, 2003 || Socorro || LINEAR || — || align=right data-sort-value="0.98" | 980 m || 
|}

323201–323300 

|-bgcolor=#d6d6d6
| 323201 ||  || — || August 28, 2003 || Palomar || NEAT || — || align=right | 3.5 km || 
|-id=202 bgcolor=#fefefe
| 323202 ||  || — || September 15, 2003 || Anderson Mesa || LONEOS || — || align=right data-sort-value="0.99" | 990 m || 
|-id=203 bgcolor=#fefefe
| 323203 ||  || — || September 15, 2003 || Anderson Mesa || LONEOS || — || align=right data-sort-value="0.80" | 800 m || 
|-id=204 bgcolor=#d6d6d6
| 323204 ||  || — || September 15, 2003 || Palomar || NEAT || EUP || align=right | 7.1 km || 
|-id=205 bgcolor=#d6d6d6
| 323205 ||  || — || September 16, 2003 || Kitt Peak || Spacewatch || — || align=right | 3.6 km || 
|-id=206 bgcolor=#fefefe
| 323206 ||  || — || September 16, 2003 || Kitt Peak || Spacewatch || V || align=right data-sort-value="0.68" | 680 m || 
|-id=207 bgcolor=#fefefe
| 323207 ||  || — || September 16, 2003 || Kitt Peak || Spacewatch || — || align=right data-sort-value="0.72" | 720 m || 
|-id=208 bgcolor=#d6d6d6
| 323208 ||  || — || September 17, 2003 || Kitt Peak || Spacewatch || URS || align=right | 4.5 km || 
|-id=209 bgcolor=#d6d6d6
| 323209 ||  || — || September 16, 2003 || Kitt Peak || Spacewatch || TIR || align=right | 3.8 km || 
|-id=210 bgcolor=#fefefe
| 323210 ||  || — || September 17, 2003 || Kitt Peak || Spacewatch || — || align=right data-sort-value="0.88" | 880 m || 
|-id=211 bgcolor=#d6d6d6
| 323211 ||  || — || September 18, 2003 || Palomar || NEAT || — || align=right | 3.8 km || 
|-id=212 bgcolor=#d6d6d6
| 323212 ||  || — || September 18, 2003 || Kitt Peak || Spacewatch || — || align=right | 3.9 km || 
|-id=213 bgcolor=#d6d6d6
| 323213 ||  || — || September 17, 2003 || Kitt Peak || Spacewatch || — || align=right | 4.9 km || 
|-id=214 bgcolor=#fefefe
| 323214 ||  || — || September 16, 2003 || Palomar || NEAT || KLI || align=right | 2.1 km || 
|-id=215 bgcolor=#fefefe
| 323215 ||  || — || September 16, 2003 || Palomar || NEAT || V || align=right data-sort-value="0.97" | 970 m || 
|-id=216 bgcolor=#fefefe
| 323216 ||  || — || September 16, 2003 || Palomar || NEAT || PHO || align=right | 1.9 km || 
|-id=217 bgcolor=#fefefe
| 323217 ||  || — || September 16, 2003 || Anderson Mesa || LONEOS || — || align=right | 1.2 km || 
|-id=218 bgcolor=#fefefe
| 323218 ||  || — || September 16, 2003 || Anderson Mesa || LONEOS || FLO || align=right | 1.4 km || 
|-id=219 bgcolor=#fefefe
| 323219 ||  || — || September 18, 2003 || Kitt Peak || Spacewatch || — || align=right data-sort-value="0.86" | 860 m || 
|-id=220 bgcolor=#d6d6d6
| 323220 ||  || — || September 19, 2003 || Kitt Peak || Spacewatch || EOS || align=right | 3.7 km || 
|-id=221 bgcolor=#d6d6d6
| 323221 ||  || — || September 19, 2003 || Kitt Peak || Spacewatch || — || align=right | 4.3 km || 
|-id=222 bgcolor=#fefefe
| 323222 ||  || — || September 19, 2003 || Kitt Peak || Spacewatch || — || align=right | 1.0 km || 
|-id=223 bgcolor=#fefefe
| 323223 ||  || — || September 16, 2003 || Palomar || NEAT || V || align=right data-sort-value="0.84" | 840 m || 
|-id=224 bgcolor=#d6d6d6
| 323224 ||  || — || September 19, 2003 || Palomar || NEAT || — || align=right | 4.4 km || 
|-id=225 bgcolor=#fefefe
| 323225 ||  || — || September 19, 2003 || Kitt Peak || Spacewatch || V || align=right data-sort-value="0.94" | 940 m || 
|-id=226 bgcolor=#d6d6d6
| 323226 ||  || — || September 18, 2003 || Goodricke-Pigott || R. A. Tucker || — || align=right | 3.4 km || 
|-id=227 bgcolor=#d6d6d6
| 323227 ||  || — || September 16, 2003 || Kitt Peak || Spacewatch || — || align=right | 4.3 km || 
|-id=228 bgcolor=#d6d6d6
| 323228 ||  || — || September 18, 2003 || Socorro || LINEAR || — || align=right | 4.3 km || 
|-id=229 bgcolor=#d6d6d6
| 323229 ||  || — || September 18, 2003 || Kitt Peak || Spacewatch || HYG || align=right | 2.8 km || 
|-id=230 bgcolor=#fefefe
| 323230 ||  || — || September 20, 2003 || Palomar || NEAT || — || align=right | 1.3 km || 
|-id=231 bgcolor=#fefefe
| 323231 ||  || — || September 19, 2003 || Anderson Mesa || LONEOS || — || align=right | 1.1 km || 
|-id=232 bgcolor=#d6d6d6
| 323232 ||  || — || September 19, 2003 || Anderson Mesa || LONEOS || — || align=right | 4.5 km || 
|-id=233 bgcolor=#d6d6d6
| 323233 ||  || — || September 19, 2003 || Socorro || LINEAR || — || align=right | 4.8 km || 
|-id=234 bgcolor=#fefefe
| 323234 ||  || — || September 21, 2003 || Palomar || NEAT || — || align=right data-sort-value="0.95" | 950 m || 
|-id=235 bgcolor=#fefefe
| 323235 ||  || — || September 18, 2003 || Kitt Peak || Spacewatch || FLO || align=right data-sort-value="0.56" | 560 m || 
|-id=236 bgcolor=#fefefe
| 323236 ||  || — || September 18, 2003 || Socorro || LINEAR || — || align=right data-sort-value="0.92" | 920 m || 
|-id=237 bgcolor=#d6d6d6
| 323237 ||  || — || September 18, 2003 || Palomar || NEAT || — || align=right | 2.9 km || 
|-id=238 bgcolor=#fefefe
| 323238 ||  || — || September 18, 2003 || Palomar || NEAT || FLO || align=right | 1.4 km || 
|-id=239 bgcolor=#d6d6d6
| 323239 ||  || — || September 19, 2003 || Kitt Peak || Spacewatch || — || align=right | 3.7 km || 
|-id=240 bgcolor=#fefefe
| 323240 ||  || — || September 22, 2003 || Socorro || LINEAR || FLO || align=right | 1.0 km || 
|-id=241 bgcolor=#fefefe
| 323241 ||  || — || September 22, 2003 || Anderson Mesa || LONEOS || FLO || align=right data-sort-value="0.83" | 830 m || 
|-id=242 bgcolor=#d6d6d6
| 323242 ||  || — || September 20, 2003 || Palomar || NEAT || — || align=right | 4.3 km || 
|-id=243 bgcolor=#fefefe
| 323243 ||  || — || September 23, 2003 || Emerald Lane || L. Ball || V || align=right data-sort-value="0.64" | 640 m || 
|-id=244 bgcolor=#d6d6d6
| 323244 ||  || — || September 23, 2003 || Haleakala || NEAT || — || align=right | 3.5 km || 
|-id=245 bgcolor=#d6d6d6
| 323245 ||  || — || September 27, 2003 || Kitt Peak || Spacewatch || — || align=right | 3.4 km || 
|-id=246 bgcolor=#d6d6d6
| 323246 ||  || — || September 27, 2003 || Socorro || LINEAR || — || align=right | 5.7 km || 
|-id=247 bgcolor=#fefefe
| 323247 ||  || — || September 24, 2003 || Palomar || NEAT || V || align=right data-sort-value="0.89" | 890 m || 
|-id=248 bgcolor=#d6d6d6
| 323248 ||  || — || September 25, 2003 || Palomar || NEAT || — || align=right | 3.5 km || 
|-id=249 bgcolor=#fefefe
| 323249 ||  || — || September 25, 2003 || Palomar || NEAT || — || align=right data-sort-value="0.98" | 980 m || 
|-id=250 bgcolor=#d6d6d6
| 323250 ||  || — || September 25, 2003 || Palomar || NEAT || — || align=right | 3.8 km || 
|-id=251 bgcolor=#fefefe
| 323251 ||  || — || September 26, 2003 || Socorro || LINEAR || — || align=right | 1.1 km || 
|-id=252 bgcolor=#d6d6d6
| 323252 ||  || — || September 27, 2003 || Socorro || LINEAR || — || align=right | 4.1 km || 
|-id=253 bgcolor=#d6d6d6
| 323253 ||  || — || September 25, 2003 || Haleakala || NEAT || — || align=right | 3.7 km || 
|-id=254 bgcolor=#fefefe
| 323254 ||  || — || September 18, 2003 || Kitt Peak || Spacewatch || — || align=right data-sort-value="0.79" | 790 m || 
|-id=255 bgcolor=#d6d6d6
| 323255 ||  || — || September 27, 2003 || Kitt Peak || Spacewatch || HYG || align=right | 2.4 km || 
|-id=256 bgcolor=#fefefe
| 323256 ||  || — || September 29, 2003 || Kitt Peak || Spacewatch || V || align=right data-sort-value="0.60" | 600 m || 
|-id=257 bgcolor=#d6d6d6
| 323257 ||  || — || September 27, 2003 || Socorro || LINEAR || — || align=right | 4.0 km || 
|-id=258 bgcolor=#d6d6d6
| 323258 ||  || — || September 18, 2003 || Kitt Peak || Spacewatch || — || align=right | 2.7 km || 
|-id=259 bgcolor=#fefefe
| 323259 ||  || — || September 20, 2003 || Kitt Peak || Spacewatch || FLO || align=right data-sort-value="0.73" | 730 m || 
|-id=260 bgcolor=#d6d6d6
| 323260 ||  || — || September 28, 2003 || Anderson Mesa || LONEOS || — || align=right | 4.3 km || 
|-id=261 bgcolor=#d6d6d6
| 323261 ||  || — || September 26, 2003 || Apache Point || SDSS || EOS || align=right | 2.3 km || 
|-id=262 bgcolor=#d6d6d6
| 323262 ||  || — || September 16, 2003 || Kitt Peak || Spacewatch || HYG || align=right | 3.4 km || 
|-id=263 bgcolor=#fefefe
| 323263 ||  || — || September 17, 2003 || Kitt Peak || Spacewatch || — || align=right data-sort-value="0.74" | 740 m || 
|-id=264 bgcolor=#d6d6d6
| 323264 ||  || — || September 18, 2003 || Kitt Peak || Spacewatch || — || align=right | 3.6 km || 
|-id=265 bgcolor=#d6d6d6
| 323265 ||  || — || September 18, 2003 || Kitt Peak || Spacewatch || — || align=right | 3.2 km || 
|-id=266 bgcolor=#d6d6d6
| 323266 ||  || — || September 19, 2003 || Campo Imperatore || CINEOS || EOS || align=right | 2.7 km || 
|-id=267 bgcolor=#fefefe
| 323267 ||  || — || September 26, 2003 || Apache Point || SDSS || V || align=right data-sort-value="0.57" | 570 m || 
|-id=268 bgcolor=#d6d6d6
| 323268 ||  || — || September 28, 2003 || Apache Point || SDSS || — || align=right | 3.1 km || 
|-id=269 bgcolor=#fefefe
| 323269 ||  || — || September 21, 2003 || Palomar || NEAT || FLO || align=right data-sort-value="0.55" | 550 m || 
|-id=270 bgcolor=#d6d6d6
| 323270 ||  || — || September 18, 2003 || Palomar || NEAT || — || align=right | 3.6 km || 
|-id=271 bgcolor=#fefefe
| 323271 ||  || — || September 20, 2003 || Kitt Peak || Spacewatch || — || align=right data-sort-value="0.79" | 790 m || 
|-id=272 bgcolor=#fefefe
| 323272 ||  || — || September 26, 2003 || Apache Point || SDSS || — || align=right data-sort-value="0.97" | 970 m || 
|-id=273 bgcolor=#fefefe
| 323273 ||  || — || September 26, 2003 || Apache Point || SDSS || — || align=right data-sort-value="0.79" | 790 m || 
|-id=274 bgcolor=#d6d6d6
| 323274 ||  || — || September 26, 2003 || Apache Point || SDSS || VER || align=right | 3.4 km || 
|-id=275 bgcolor=#d6d6d6
| 323275 ||  || — || September 27, 2003 || Kitt Peak || Spacewatch || — || align=right | 2.9 km || 
|-id=276 bgcolor=#d6d6d6
| 323276 ||  || — || September 28, 2003 || Apache Point || SDSS || — || align=right | 3.2 km || 
|-id=277 bgcolor=#d6d6d6
| 323277 ||  || — || September 18, 2003 || Kitt Peak || Spacewatch || — || align=right | 4.1 km || 
|-id=278 bgcolor=#d6d6d6
| 323278 ||  || — || September 28, 2003 || Anderson Mesa || LONEOS || — || align=right | 3.8 km || 
|-id=279 bgcolor=#fefefe
| 323279 ||  || — || September 28, 2003 || Kitt Peak || Spacewatch || — || align=right data-sort-value="0.69" | 690 m || 
|-id=280 bgcolor=#d6d6d6
| 323280 ||  || — || September 29, 2003 || Kitt Peak || Spacewatch || ALA || align=right | 3.7 km || 
|-id=281 bgcolor=#fefefe
| 323281 ||  || — || September 19, 2003 || Kitt Peak || Spacewatch || — || align=right data-sort-value="0.79" | 790 m || 
|-id=282 bgcolor=#d6d6d6
| 323282 ||  || — || March 3, 2001 || Kitt Peak || Spacewatch || — || align=right | 3.2 km || 
|-id=283 bgcolor=#d6d6d6
| 323283 ||  || — || September 19, 2003 || Kitt Peak || Spacewatch || — || align=right | 4.2 km || 
|-id=284 bgcolor=#d6d6d6
| 323284 ||  || — || September 20, 2003 || Campo Imperatore || CINEOS || EOS || align=right | 4.7 km || 
|-id=285 bgcolor=#d6d6d6
| 323285 ||  || — || October 4, 2003 || Kingsnake || J. V. McClusky || — || align=right | 6.2 km || 
|-id=286 bgcolor=#fefefe
| 323286 ||  || — || October 3, 2003 || Haleakala || NEAT || FLO || align=right data-sort-value="0.93" | 930 m || 
|-id=287 bgcolor=#d6d6d6
| 323287 ||  || — || October 14, 2003 || Anderson Mesa || LONEOS || — || align=right | 3.9 km || 
|-id=288 bgcolor=#fefefe
| 323288 ||  || — || October 15, 2003 || Anderson Mesa || LONEOS || — || align=right | 1.0 km || 
|-id=289 bgcolor=#fefefe
| 323289 ||  || — || October 15, 2003 || Anderson Mesa || LONEOS || NYS || align=right | 1.3 km || 
|-id=290 bgcolor=#fefefe
| 323290 ||  || — || October 15, 2003 || Anderson Mesa || LONEOS || — || align=right | 1.3 km || 
|-id=291 bgcolor=#fefefe
| 323291 ||  || — || October 14, 2003 || Palomar || NEAT || — || align=right | 1.1 km || 
|-id=292 bgcolor=#fefefe
| 323292 ||  || — || October 1, 2003 || Kitt Peak || Spacewatch || — || align=right data-sort-value="0.98" | 980 m || 
|-id=293 bgcolor=#d6d6d6
| 323293 ||  || — || September 21, 2003 || Kitt Peak || Spacewatch || VER || align=right | 3.1 km || 
|-id=294 bgcolor=#fefefe
| 323294 ||  || — || October 2, 2003 || Kitt Peak || Spacewatch || — || align=right data-sort-value="0.92" | 920 m || 
|-id=295 bgcolor=#fefefe
| 323295 ||  || — || October 5, 2003 || Kitt Peak || Spacewatch || — || align=right data-sort-value="0.68" | 680 m || 
|-id=296 bgcolor=#FA8072
| 323296 ||  || — || October 18, 2003 || Palomar || NEAT || — || align=right data-sort-value="0.86" | 860 m || 
|-id=297 bgcolor=#d6d6d6
| 323297 ||  || — || October 18, 2003 || Kleť || Kleť Obs. || — || align=right | 3.9 km || 
|-id=298 bgcolor=#fefefe
| 323298 ||  || — || October 17, 2003 || Bergisch Gladbach || W. Bickel || — || align=right | 1.0 km || 
|-id=299 bgcolor=#fefefe
| 323299 ||  || — || October 17, 2003 || Kitt Peak || Spacewatch || V || align=right data-sort-value="0.81" | 810 m || 
|-id=300 bgcolor=#FFC2E0
| 323300 ||  || — || October 23, 2003 || Socorro || LINEAR || APO || align=right data-sort-value="0.43" | 430 m || 
|}

323301–323400 

|-bgcolor=#fefefe
| 323301 ||  || — || October 22, 2003 || Kvistaberg || UDAS || FLO || align=right data-sort-value="0.89" | 890 m || 
|-id=302 bgcolor=#fefefe
| 323302 ||  || — || October 23, 2003 || Kvistaberg || UDAS || MAS || align=right data-sort-value="0.84" | 840 m || 
|-id=303 bgcolor=#fefefe
| 323303 ||  || — || October 22, 2003 || Kitt Peak || Spacewatch || FLO || align=right data-sort-value="0.67" | 670 m || 
|-id=304 bgcolor=#fefefe
| 323304 ||  || — || October 24, 2003 || Socorro || LINEAR || — || align=right | 1.2 km || 
|-id=305 bgcolor=#fefefe
| 323305 ||  || — || October 16, 2003 || Anderson Mesa || LONEOS || ERI || align=right | 1.6 km || 
|-id=306 bgcolor=#fefefe
| 323306 ||  || — || October 19, 2003 || Kitt Peak || Spacewatch || FLO || align=right data-sort-value="0.74" | 740 m || 
|-id=307 bgcolor=#fefefe
| 323307 ||  || — || October 16, 2003 || Anderson Mesa || LONEOS || FLO || align=right | 1.4 km || 
|-id=308 bgcolor=#FA8072
| 323308 ||  || — || October 16, 2003 || Anderson Mesa || LONEOS || — || align=right data-sort-value="0.89" | 890 m || 
|-id=309 bgcolor=#fefefe
| 323309 ||  || — || October 18, 2003 || Haleakala || NEAT || — || align=right | 1.1 km || 
|-id=310 bgcolor=#fefefe
| 323310 ||  || — || September 29, 2003 || Socorro || LINEAR || V || align=right data-sort-value="0.67" | 670 m || 
|-id=311 bgcolor=#d6d6d6
| 323311 ||  || — || October 18, 2003 || Kitt Peak || Spacewatch || — || align=right | 4.7 km || 
|-id=312 bgcolor=#d6d6d6
| 323312 ||  || — || October 19, 2003 || Kitt Peak || Spacewatch || — || align=right | 4.5 km || 
|-id=313 bgcolor=#fefefe
| 323313 ||  || — || October 20, 2003 || Socorro || LINEAR || — || align=right data-sort-value="0.92" | 920 m || 
|-id=314 bgcolor=#d6d6d6
| 323314 ||  || — || October 19, 2003 || Palomar || NEAT || — || align=right | 3.8 km || 
|-id=315 bgcolor=#d6d6d6
| 323315 ||  || — || October 20, 2003 || Kitt Peak || Spacewatch || — || align=right | 3.8 km || 
|-id=316 bgcolor=#fefefe
| 323316 ||  || — || October 20, 2003 || Socorro || LINEAR || V || align=right data-sort-value="0.77" | 770 m || 
|-id=317 bgcolor=#fefefe
| 323317 ||  || — || October 20, 2003 || Kitt Peak || Spacewatch || — || align=right data-sort-value="0.76" | 760 m || 
|-id=318 bgcolor=#d6d6d6
| 323318 ||  || — || October 20, 2003 || Kitt Peak || Spacewatch || — || align=right | 4.6 km || 
|-id=319 bgcolor=#fefefe
| 323319 ||  || — || October 30, 2003 || Socorro || LINEAR || H || align=right data-sort-value="0.89" | 890 m || 
|-id=320 bgcolor=#fefefe
| 323320 ||  || — || October 17, 2003 || Kitt Peak || Spacewatch || — || align=right data-sort-value="0.93" | 930 m || 
|-id=321 bgcolor=#fefefe
| 323321 ||  || — || October 19, 2003 || Palomar || NEAT || — || align=right data-sort-value="0.87" | 870 m || 
|-id=322 bgcolor=#fefefe
| 323322 ||  || — || September 22, 2003 || Palomar || NEAT || — || align=right data-sort-value="0.77" | 770 m || 
|-id=323 bgcolor=#d6d6d6
| 323323 ||  || — || October 21, 2003 || Anderson Mesa || LONEOS || — || align=right | 4.3 km || 
|-id=324 bgcolor=#fefefe
| 323324 ||  || — || October 21, 2003 || Palomar || NEAT || V || align=right data-sort-value="0.81" | 810 m || 
|-id=325 bgcolor=#fefefe
| 323325 ||  || — || October 18, 2003 || Anderson Mesa || LONEOS || FLO || align=right data-sort-value="0.74" | 740 m || 
|-id=326 bgcolor=#d6d6d6
| 323326 ||  || — || October 21, 2003 || Kitt Peak || Spacewatch || EUP || align=right | 6.1 km || 
|-id=327 bgcolor=#fefefe
| 323327 ||  || — || October 15, 2003 || Anderson Mesa || LONEOS || NYS || align=right data-sort-value="0.73" | 730 m || 
|-id=328 bgcolor=#d6d6d6
| 323328 ||  || — || October 21, 2003 || Socorro || LINEAR || SYL7:4 || align=right | 5.0 km || 
|-id=329 bgcolor=#fefefe
| 323329 ||  || — || October 22, 2003 || Socorro || LINEAR || — || align=right data-sort-value="0.69" | 690 m || 
|-id=330 bgcolor=#fefefe
| 323330 ||  || — || October 20, 2003 || Socorro || LINEAR || — || align=right | 1.2 km || 
|-id=331 bgcolor=#fefefe
| 323331 ||  || — || October 21, 2003 || Kitt Peak || Spacewatch || — || align=right | 1.0 km || 
|-id=332 bgcolor=#fefefe
| 323332 ||  || — || October 21, 2003 || Palomar || NEAT || NYS || align=right data-sort-value="0.68" | 680 m || 
|-id=333 bgcolor=#fefefe
| 323333 ||  || — || October 21, 2003 || Kitt Peak || Spacewatch || MAS || align=right data-sort-value="0.69" | 690 m || 
|-id=334 bgcolor=#d6d6d6
| 323334 ||  || — || October 22, 2003 || Socorro || LINEAR || EOS || align=right | 2.5 km || 
|-id=335 bgcolor=#fefefe
| 323335 ||  || — || October 23, 2003 || Anderson Mesa || LONEOS || NYS || align=right data-sort-value="0.95" | 950 m || 
|-id=336 bgcolor=#d6d6d6
| 323336 ||  || — || October 20, 2003 || Kitt Peak || Spacewatch || ALA || align=right | 4.0 km || 
|-id=337 bgcolor=#fefefe
| 323337 ||  || — || October 21, 2003 || Kitt Peak || Spacewatch || — || align=right data-sort-value="0.83" | 830 m || 
|-id=338 bgcolor=#d6d6d6
| 323338 ||  || — || October 23, 2003 || Haleakala || NEAT || — || align=right | 5.4 km || 
|-id=339 bgcolor=#fefefe
| 323339 ||  || — || September 18, 2003 || Kitt Peak || Spacewatch || NYS || align=right data-sort-value="0.70" | 700 m || 
|-id=340 bgcolor=#fefefe
| 323340 ||  || — || October 3, 2003 || Kitt Peak || Spacewatch || — || align=right data-sort-value="0.77" | 770 m || 
|-id=341 bgcolor=#fefefe
| 323341 ||  || — || October 24, 2003 || Kitt Peak || Spacewatch || — || align=right | 1.2 km || 
|-id=342 bgcolor=#d6d6d6
| 323342 ||  || — || October 26, 2003 || Kitt Peak || Spacewatch || — || align=right | 4.2 km || 
|-id=343 bgcolor=#fefefe
| 323343 ||  || — || October 23, 2003 || Kitt Peak || Spacewatch || — || align=right | 1.1 km || 
|-id=344 bgcolor=#fefefe
| 323344 ||  || — || October 25, 2003 || Socorro || LINEAR || NYS || align=right data-sort-value="0.85" | 850 m || 
|-id=345 bgcolor=#fefefe
| 323345 ||  || — || September 28, 2003 || Kitt Peak || Spacewatch || V || align=right data-sort-value="0.67" | 670 m || 
|-id=346 bgcolor=#fefefe
| 323346 ||  || — || September 20, 2003 || Anderson Mesa || LONEOS || V || align=right data-sort-value="0.65" | 650 m || 
|-id=347 bgcolor=#d6d6d6
| 323347 ||  || — || October 17, 2003 || Kitt Peak || Spacewatch || HYG || align=right | 3.3 km || 
|-id=348 bgcolor=#d6d6d6
| 323348 ||  || — || October 17, 2003 || Apache Point || SDSS || — || align=right | 2.9 km || 
|-id=349 bgcolor=#d6d6d6
| 323349 ||  || — || October 17, 2003 || Apache Point || SDSS || EOS || align=right | 2.6 km || 
|-id=350 bgcolor=#fefefe
| 323350 ||  || — || October 18, 2003 || Apache Point || SDSS || FLO || align=right data-sort-value="0.74" | 740 m || 
|-id=351 bgcolor=#fefefe
| 323351 ||  || — || October 18, 2003 || Apache Point || SDSS || — || align=right data-sort-value="0.84" | 840 m || 
|-id=352 bgcolor=#d6d6d6
| 323352 ||  || — || September 16, 2003 || Kitt Peak || Spacewatch || ALA || align=right | 2.7 km || 
|-id=353 bgcolor=#d6d6d6
| 323353 ||  || — || October 19, 2003 || Kitt Peak || Spacewatch || — || align=right | 3.4 km || 
|-id=354 bgcolor=#d6d6d6
| 323354 ||  || — || September 16, 2003 || Kitt Peak || Spacewatch || THM || align=right | 2.9 km || 
|-id=355 bgcolor=#fefefe
| 323355 ||  || — || October 20, 2003 || Kitt Peak || Spacewatch || — || align=right data-sort-value="0.74" | 740 m || 
|-id=356 bgcolor=#d6d6d6
| 323356 ||  || — || October 22, 2003 || Apache Point || SDSS || — || align=right | 2.9 km || 
|-id=357 bgcolor=#fefefe
| 323357 ||  || — || October 22, 2003 || Apache Point || SDSS || — || align=right data-sort-value="0.67" | 670 m || 
|-id=358 bgcolor=#fefefe
| 323358 ||  || — || October 22, 2003 || Apache Point || SDSS || — || align=right data-sort-value="0.76" | 760 m || 
|-id=359 bgcolor=#d6d6d6
| 323359 ||  || — || September 28, 2003 || Kitt Peak || Spacewatch || — || align=right | 2.4 km || 
|-id=360 bgcolor=#fefefe
| 323360 ||  || — || October 23, 2003 || Apache Point || SDSS || — || align=right | 1.0 km || 
|-id=361 bgcolor=#fefefe
| 323361 ||  || — || November 16, 2003 || Catalina || CSS || — || align=right data-sort-value="0.79" | 790 m || 
|-id=362 bgcolor=#fefefe
| 323362 ||  || — || October 25, 2003 || Socorro || LINEAR || — || align=right | 1.1 km || 
|-id=363 bgcolor=#d6d6d6
| 323363 ||  || — || November 18, 2003 || Palomar || NEAT || — || align=right | 5.4 km || 
|-id=364 bgcolor=#fefefe
| 323364 ||  || — || November 18, 2003 || Palomar || NEAT || FLO || align=right data-sort-value="0.99" | 990 m || 
|-id=365 bgcolor=#fefefe
| 323365 ||  || — || November 19, 2003 || Kitt Peak || Spacewatch || — || align=right | 1.1 km || 
|-id=366 bgcolor=#fefefe
| 323366 ||  || — || November 19, 2003 || Kitt Peak || Spacewatch || NYS || align=right data-sort-value="0.63" | 630 m || 
|-id=367 bgcolor=#d6d6d6
| 323367 ||  || — || November 18, 2003 || Palomar || NEAT || THM || align=right | 3.3 km || 
|-id=368 bgcolor=#fefefe
| 323368 ||  || — || November 19, 2003 || Kitt Peak || Spacewatch || FLO || align=right data-sort-value="0.90" | 900 m || 
|-id=369 bgcolor=#d6d6d6
| 323369 ||  || — || November 20, 2003 || Palomar || NEAT || — || align=right | 5.5 km || 
|-id=370 bgcolor=#fefefe
| 323370 ||  || — || November 19, 2003 || Anderson Mesa || LONEOS || — || align=right data-sort-value="0.88" | 880 m || 
|-id=371 bgcolor=#fefefe
| 323371 ||  || — || November 21, 2003 || Socorro || LINEAR || — || align=right data-sort-value="0.80" | 800 m || 
|-id=372 bgcolor=#d6d6d6
| 323372 ||  || — || November 20, 2003 || Socorro || LINEAR || 7:4 || align=right | 4.5 km || 
|-id=373 bgcolor=#fefefe
| 323373 ||  || — || November 20, 2003 || Socorro || LINEAR || — || align=right | 1.3 km || 
|-id=374 bgcolor=#fefefe
| 323374 ||  || — || November 20, 2003 || Socorro || LINEAR || — || align=right | 1.0 km || 
|-id=375 bgcolor=#fefefe
| 323375 ||  || — || November 20, 2003 || Socorro || LINEAR || NYS || align=right data-sort-value="0.80" | 800 m || 
|-id=376 bgcolor=#fefefe
| 323376 ||  || — || November 23, 2003 || Socorro || LINEAR || MAS || align=right data-sort-value="0.82" | 820 m || 
|-id=377 bgcolor=#d6d6d6
| 323377 ||  || — || November 24, 2003 || Socorro || LINEAR || TIR || align=right | 5.4 km || 
|-id=378 bgcolor=#fefefe
| 323378 ||  || — || December 1, 2003 || Socorro || LINEAR || — || align=right | 1.0 km || 
|-id=379 bgcolor=#fefefe
| 323379 ||  || — || November 19, 2003 || Kitt Peak || Spacewatch || — || align=right data-sort-value="0.83" | 830 m || 
|-id=380 bgcolor=#fefefe
| 323380 ||  || — || December 17, 2003 || Socorro || LINEAR || H || align=right data-sort-value="0.95" | 950 m || 
|-id=381 bgcolor=#fefefe
| 323381 ||  || — || December 17, 2003 || Anderson Mesa || LONEOS || H || align=right | 1.0 km || 
|-id=382 bgcolor=#fefefe
| 323382 ||  || — || December 18, 2003 || Socorro || LINEAR || MAS || align=right data-sort-value="0.87" | 870 m || 
|-id=383 bgcolor=#fefefe
| 323383 ||  || — || December 19, 2003 || Socorro || LINEAR || MAS || align=right data-sort-value="0.87" | 870 m || 
|-id=384 bgcolor=#fefefe
| 323384 ||  || — || December 19, 2003 || Kitt Peak || Spacewatch || NYS || align=right data-sort-value="0.80" | 800 m || 
|-id=385 bgcolor=#fefefe
| 323385 ||  || — || December 21, 2003 || Kitt Peak || Spacewatch || V || align=right data-sort-value="0.68" | 680 m || 
|-id=386 bgcolor=#fefefe
| 323386 ||  || — || December 18, 2003 || Kitt Peak || Spacewatch || — || align=right | 1.0 km || 
|-id=387 bgcolor=#fefefe
| 323387 ||  || — || December 18, 2003 || Socorro || LINEAR || — || align=right | 1.5 km || 
|-id=388 bgcolor=#fefefe
| 323388 ||  || — || December 20, 2003 || Socorro || LINEAR || V || align=right data-sort-value="0.79" | 790 m || 
|-id=389 bgcolor=#fefefe
| 323389 ||  || — || December 21, 2003 || Socorro || LINEAR || FLO || align=right data-sort-value="0.74" | 740 m || 
|-id=390 bgcolor=#fefefe
| 323390 ||  || — || December 19, 2003 || Socorro || LINEAR || NYS || align=right data-sort-value="0.81" | 810 m || 
|-id=391 bgcolor=#E9E9E9
| 323391 ||  || — || December 21, 2003 || Socorro || LINEAR || — || align=right | 1.2 km || 
|-id=392 bgcolor=#fefefe
| 323392 ||  || — || December 22, 2003 || Socorro || LINEAR || — || align=right | 1.3 km || 
|-id=393 bgcolor=#fefefe
| 323393 ||  || — || December 27, 2003 || Socorro || LINEAR || V || align=right data-sort-value="0.68" | 680 m || 
|-id=394 bgcolor=#fefefe
| 323394 ||  || — || December 27, 2003 || Socorro || LINEAR || NYS || align=right data-sort-value="0.77" | 770 m || 
|-id=395 bgcolor=#fefefe
| 323395 ||  || — || December 28, 2003 || Kitt Peak || Spacewatch || V || align=right data-sort-value="0.74" | 740 m || 
|-id=396 bgcolor=#fefefe
| 323396 ||  || — || January 13, 2004 || Anderson Mesa || LONEOS || H || align=right data-sort-value="0.71" | 710 m || 
|-id=397 bgcolor=#fefefe
| 323397 ||  || — || January 13, 2004 || Kitt Peak || Spacewatch || V || align=right | 1.0 km || 
|-id=398 bgcolor=#fefefe
| 323398 ||  || — || January 15, 2004 || Kitt Peak || Spacewatch || — || align=right data-sort-value="0.84" | 840 m || 
|-id=399 bgcolor=#fefefe
| 323399 ||  || — || January 16, 2004 || Kitt Peak || Spacewatch || NYS || align=right data-sort-value="0.71" | 710 m || 
|-id=400 bgcolor=#fefefe
| 323400 ||  || — || January 18, 2004 || Kitt Peak || Spacewatch || — || align=right data-sort-value="0.95" | 950 m || 
|}

323401–323500 

|-bgcolor=#fefefe
| 323401 ||  || — || January 17, 2004 || Palomar || NEAT || — || align=right data-sort-value="0.89" | 890 m || 
|-id=402 bgcolor=#fefefe
| 323402 ||  || — || January 18, 2004 || Palomar || NEAT || — || align=right | 1.2 km || 
|-id=403 bgcolor=#fefefe
| 323403 ||  || — || January 18, 2004 || Palomar || NEAT || V || align=right data-sort-value="0.82" | 820 m || 
|-id=404 bgcolor=#fefefe
| 323404 ||  || — || January 19, 2004 || Kitt Peak || Spacewatch || — || align=right | 1.1 km || 
|-id=405 bgcolor=#fefefe
| 323405 ||  || — || January 22, 2004 || Socorro || LINEAR || — || align=right | 1.1 km || 
|-id=406 bgcolor=#fefefe
| 323406 ||  || — || January 29, 2004 || Socorro || LINEAR || H || align=right data-sort-value="0.87" | 870 m || 
|-id=407 bgcolor=#fefefe
| 323407 ||  || — || January 16, 2004 || Kitt Peak || Spacewatch || MAS || align=right data-sort-value="0.65" | 650 m || 
|-id=408 bgcolor=#fefefe
| 323408 ||  || — || January 17, 2004 || Kitt Peak || Spacewatch || — || align=right data-sort-value="0.73" | 730 m || 
|-id=409 bgcolor=#fefefe
| 323409 ||  || — || February 12, 2004 || Kitt Peak || Spacewatch || MAS || align=right data-sort-value="0.85" | 850 m || 
|-id=410 bgcolor=#fefefe
| 323410 ||  || — || February 13, 2004 || Kitt Peak || Spacewatch || V || align=right data-sort-value="0.89" | 890 m || 
|-id=411 bgcolor=#fefefe
| 323411 ||  || — || February 14, 2004 || Catalina || CSS || H || align=right data-sort-value="0.89" | 890 m || 
|-id=412 bgcolor=#fefefe
| 323412 ||  || — || February 11, 2004 || Anderson Mesa || LONEOS || — || align=right | 1.3 km || 
|-id=413 bgcolor=#fefefe
| 323413 ||  || — || February 12, 2004 || Kitt Peak || Spacewatch || — || align=right data-sort-value="0.99" | 990 m || 
|-id=414 bgcolor=#fefefe
| 323414 ||  || — || February 17, 2004 || Catalina || CSS || H || align=right data-sort-value="0.57" | 570 m || 
|-id=415 bgcolor=#fefefe
| 323415 ||  || — || February 22, 2004 || Kitt Peak || Spacewatch || NYS || align=right data-sort-value="0.66" | 660 m || 
|-id=416 bgcolor=#fefefe
| 323416 ||  || — || March 14, 2004 || Socorro || LINEAR || H || align=right data-sort-value="0.82" | 820 m || 
|-id=417 bgcolor=#d6d6d6
| 323417 ||  || — || March 11, 2004 || Palomar || NEAT || HIL3:2 || align=right | 5.6 km || 
|-id=418 bgcolor=#E9E9E9
| 323418 ||  || — || March 12, 2004 || Palomar || NEAT || — || align=right data-sort-value="0.97" | 970 m || 
|-id=419 bgcolor=#E9E9E9
| 323419 ||  || — || March 14, 2004 || Catalina || CSS || — || align=right | 1.5 km || 
|-id=420 bgcolor=#fefefe
| 323420 ||  || — || March 15, 2004 || Socorro || LINEAR || H || align=right | 1.0 km || 
|-id=421 bgcolor=#E9E9E9
| 323421 ||  || — || March 15, 2004 || Socorro || LINEAR || — || align=right | 1.2 km || 
|-id=422 bgcolor=#fefefe
| 323422 ||  || — || March 15, 2004 || Kitt Peak || Spacewatch || V || align=right data-sort-value="0.84" | 840 m || 
|-id=423 bgcolor=#fefefe
| 323423 ||  || — || March 17, 2004 || Socorro || LINEAR || H || align=right data-sort-value="0.59" | 590 m || 
|-id=424 bgcolor=#fefefe
| 323424 ||  || — || March 16, 2004 || Socorro || LINEAR || H || align=right data-sort-value="0.61" | 610 m || 
|-id=425 bgcolor=#fefefe
| 323425 ||  || — || March 18, 2004 || Kitt Peak || Spacewatch || H || align=right data-sort-value="0.68" | 680 m || 
|-id=426 bgcolor=#fefefe
| 323426 ||  || — || March 24, 2004 || Catalina || CSS || — || align=right | 1.8 km || 
|-id=427 bgcolor=#fefefe
| 323427 ||  || — || March 17, 2004 || Socorro || LINEAR || H || align=right data-sort-value="0.85" | 850 m || 
|-id=428 bgcolor=#E9E9E9
| 323428 ||  || — || March 18, 2004 || Kitt Peak || Spacewatch || — || align=right | 1.2 km || 
|-id=429 bgcolor=#E9E9E9
| 323429 ||  || — || March 23, 2004 || Kitt Peak || Spacewatch || — || align=right data-sort-value="0.78" | 780 m || 
|-id=430 bgcolor=#E9E9E9
| 323430 ||  || — || March 26, 2004 || Kitt Peak || Spacewatch || EUN || align=right | 1.1 km || 
|-id=431 bgcolor=#E9E9E9
| 323431 ||  || — || March 23, 2004 || Kitt Peak || Spacewatch || — || align=right | 1.6 km || 
|-id=432 bgcolor=#fefefe
| 323432 ||  || — || March 29, 2004 || Socorro || LINEAR || H || align=right data-sort-value="0.96" | 960 m || 
|-id=433 bgcolor=#E9E9E9
| 323433 ||  || — || March 16, 2004 || Siding Spring || SSS || EUN || align=right | 1.4 km || 
|-id=434 bgcolor=#E9E9E9
| 323434 ||  || — || March 23, 2004 || Socorro || LINEAR || RAF || align=right | 1.2 km || 
|-id=435 bgcolor=#E9E9E9
| 323435 ||  || — || April 10, 2004 || Palomar || NEAT || — || align=right | 1.5 km || 
|-id=436 bgcolor=#E9E9E9
| 323436 ||  || — || April 11, 2004 || Palomar || NEAT || — || align=right | 1.6 km || 
|-id=437 bgcolor=#E9E9E9
| 323437 ||  || — || April 12, 2004 || Palomar || NEAT || — || align=right | 1.1 km || 
|-id=438 bgcolor=#fefefe
| 323438 ||  || — || April 14, 2004 || Anderson Mesa || LONEOS || H || align=right data-sort-value="0.79" | 790 m || 
|-id=439 bgcolor=#E9E9E9
| 323439 ||  || — || April 12, 2004 || Kitt Peak || Spacewatch || — || align=right | 1.1 km || 
|-id=440 bgcolor=#E9E9E9
| 323440 ||  || — || April 14, 2004 || Kitt Peak || Spacewatch || — || align=right | 1.1 km || 
|-id=441 bgcolor=#fefefe
| 323441 ||  || — || April 17, 2004 || Socorro || LINEAR || H || align=right data-sort-value="0.69" | 690 m || 
|-id=442 bgcolor=#E9E9E9
| 323442 ||  || — || April 19, 2004 || Desert Eagle || W. K. Y. Yeung || RAF || align=right data-sort-value="0.92" | 920 m || 
|-id=443 bgcolor=#E9E9E9
| 323443 ||  || — || April 17, 2004 || Socorro || LINEAR || KRM || align=right | 3.0 km || 
|-id=444 bgcolor=#E9E9E9
| 323444 ||  || — || April 19, 2004 || Socorro || LINEAR || MAR || align=right | 1.4 km || 
|-id=445 bgcolor=#E9E9E9
| 323445 ||  || — || April 20, 2004 || Socorro || LINEAR || — || align=right | 1.3 km || 
|-id=446 bgcolor=#E9E9E9
| 323446 ||  || — || April 20, 2004 || Socorro || LINEAR || — || align=right | 2.3 km || 
|-id=447 bgcolor=#E9E9E9
| 323447 ||  || — || April 20, 2004 || Socorro || LINEAR || — || align=right | 1.5 km || 
|-id=448 bgcolor=#E9E9E9
| 323448 ||  || — || April 21, 2004 || Kitt Peak || Spacewatch || — || align=right | 1.0 km || 
|-id=449 bgcolor=#E9E9E9
| 323449 ||  || — || April 21, 2004 || Reedy Creek || J. Broughton || — || align=right | 1.8 km || 
|-id=450 bgcolor=#fefefe
| 323450 ||  || — || April 22, 2004 || Socorro || LINEAR || H || align=right data-sort-value="0.79" | 790 m || 
|-id=451 bgcolor=#E9E9E9
| 323451 ||  || — || April 20, 2004 || Socorro || LINEAR || — || align=right | 1.2 km || 
|-id=452 bgcolor=#E9E9E9
| 323452 ||  || — || April 24, 2004 || Kitt Peak || Spacewatch || — || align=right | 2.0 km || 
|-id=453 bgcolor=#E9E9E9
| 323453 ||  || — || April 25, 2004 || Haleakala || NEAT || — || align=right | 1.6 km || 
|-id=454 bgcolor=#E9E9E9
| 323454 ||  || — || April 24, 2004 || Anderson Mesa || LONEOS || — || align=right | 1.6 km || 
|-id=455 bgcolor=#E9E9E9
| 323455 ||  || — || April 24, 2004 || Socorro || LINEAR || — || align=right | 1.2 km || 
|-id=456 bgcolor=#E9E9E9
| 323456 ||  || — || April 28, 2004 || Haleakala || NEAT || RAF || align=right | 1.1 km || 
|-id=457 bgcolor=#E9E9E9
| 323457 ||  || — || May 10, 2004 || Catalina || CSS || — || align=right | 1.5 km || 
|-id=458 bgcolor=#E9E9E9
| 323458 ||  || — || May 12, 2004 || Catalina || CSS || — || align=right | 2.5 km || 
|-id=459 bgcolor=#E9E9E9
| 323459 ||  || — || May 12, 2004 || Siding Spring || SSS || — || align=right | 1.2 km || 
|-id=460 bgcolor=#E9E9E9
| 323460 ||  || — || May 13, 2004 || Anderson Mesa || LONEOS || — || align=right | 2.2 km || 
|-id=461 bgcolor=#E9E9E9
| 323461 ||  || — || May 15, 2004 || Socorro || LINEAR || — || align=right | 2.1 km || 
|-id=462 bgcolor=#fefefe
| 323462 ||  || — || May 12, 2004 || Socorro || LINEAR || H || align=right | 1.2 km || 
|-id=463 bgcolor=#E9E9E9
| 323463 ||  || — || May 12, 2004 || Anderson Mesa || LONEOS || — || align=right | 1.3 km || 
|-id=464 bgcolor=#E9E9E9
| 323464 ||  || — || May 16, 2004 || Socorro || LINEAR || — || align=right | 1.5 km || 
|-id=465 bgcolor=#E9E9E9
| 323465 ||  || — || May 22, 2004 || Catalina || CSS || IAN || align=right data-sort-value="0.99" | 990 m || 
|-id=466 bgcolor=#E9E9E9
| 323466 ||  || — || May 21, 2004 || Catalina || CSS || JUN || align=right | 1.2 km || 
|-id=467 bgcolor=#fefefe
| 323467 ||  || — || May 22, 2004 || Catalina || CSS || H || align=right data-sort-value="0.80" | 800 m || 
|-id=468 bgcolor=#E9E9E9
| 323468 ||  || — || May 19, 2004 || Needville || Needville Obs. || — || align=right | 1.9 km || 
|-id=469 bgcolor=#E9E9E9
| 323469 ||  || — || May 16, 2004 || Socorro || LINEAR || ADE || align=right | 2.2 km || 
|-id=470 bgcolor=#E9E9E9
| 323470 ||  || — || May 20, 2004 || Siding Spring || SSS || — || align=right | 2.1 km || 
|-id=471 bgcolor=#FA8072
| 323471 ||  || — || June 10, 2004 || Socorro || LINEAR || — || align=right | 3.3 km || 
|-id=472 bgcolor=#E9E9E9
| 323472 ||  || — || June 11, 2004 || Kitt Peak || Spacewatch || — || align=right | 1.7 km || 
|-id=473 bgcolor=#E9E9E9
| 323473 ||  || — || June 10, 2004 || Goodricke-Pigott || R. A. Tucker || — || align=right | 2.4 km || 
|-id=474 bgcolor=#E9E9E9
| 323474 ||  || — || June 12, 2004 || Kitt Peak || Spacewatch || — || align=right | 2.4 km || 
|-id=475 bgcolor=#E9E9E9
| 323475 ||  || — || June 10, 2004 || Campo Imperatore || CINEOS || — || align=right | 1.9 km || 
|-id=476 bgcolor=#E9E9E9
| 323476 ||  || — || June 11, 2004 || Socorro || LINEAR || — || align=right | 4.2 km || 
|-id=477 bgcolor=#E9E9E9
| 323477 ||  || — || June 15, 2004 || Socorro || LINEAR || — || align=right | 3.1 km || 
|-id=478 bgcolor=#E9E9E9
| 323478 ||  || — || June 12, 2004 || Catalina || CSS || — || align=right | 1.9 km || 
|-id=479 bgcolor=#E9E9E9
| 323479 ||  || — || June 12, 2004 || Catalina || CSS || — || align=right | 2.9 km || 
|-id=480 bgcolor=#E9E9E9
| 323480 ||  || — || July 9, 2004 || Siding Spring || SSS || — || align=right | 1.6 km || 
|-id=481 bgcolor=#E9E9E9
| 323481 ||  || — || July 14, 2004 || Socorro || LINEAR || DOR || align=right | 3.0 km || 
|-id=482 bgcolor=#E9E9E9
| 323482 ||  || — || July 11, 2004 || Socorro || LINEAR || — || align=right | 1.8 km || 
|-id=483 bgcolor=#E9E9E9
| 323483 ||  || — || July 18, 2004 || Socorro || LINEAR || MRX || align=right | 1.2 km || 
|-id=484 bgcolor=#d6d6d6
| 323484 ||  || — || July 25, 2004 || Anderson Mesa || LONEOS || BRA || align=right | 2.1 km || 
|-id=485 bgcolor=#E9E9E9
| 323485 ||  || — || August 6, 2004 || Palomar || NEAT || — || align=right | 3.5 km || 
|-id=486 bgcolor=#E9E9E9
| 323486 ||  || — || August 8, 2004 || Socorro || LINEAR || — || align=right | 2.7 km || 
|-id=487 bgcolor=#E9E9E9
| 323487 ||  || — || August 9, 2004 || Socorro || LINEAR || — || align=right | 3.1 km || 
|-id=488 bgcolor=#E9E9E9
| 323488 ||  || — || August 7, 2004 || Siding Spring || SSS || MIS || align=right | 3.6 km || 
|-id=489 bgcolor=#E9E9E9
| 323489 ||  || — || August 8, 2004 || Socorro || LINEAR || — || align=right | 2.6 km || 
|-id=490 bgcolor=#d6d6d6
| 323490 ||  || — || August 8, 2004 || Palomar || NEAT || — || align=right | 2.9 km || 
|-id=491 bgcolor=#E9E9E9
| 323491 ||  || — || August 9, 2004 || Socorro || LINEAR || — || align=right | 2.8 km || 
|-id=492 bgcolor=#E9E9E9
| 323492 ||  || — || August 8, 2004 || Socorro || LINEAR || — || align=right | 2.8 km || 
|-id=493 bgcolor=#E9E9E9
| 323493 ||  || — || August 8, 2004 || Socorro || LINEAR || — || align=right | 3.0 km || 
|-id=494 bgcolor=#E9E9E9
| 323494 ||  || — || August 11, 2004 || Palomar || NEAT || EUN || align=right | 2.0 km || 
|-id=495 bgcolor=#E9E9E9
| 323495 ||  || — || August 12, 2004 || Socorro || LINEAR || — || align=right | 2.9 km || 
|-id=496 bgcolor=#d6d6d6
| 323496 ||  || — || August 12, 2004 || Socorro || LINEAR || — || align=right | 3.9 km || 
|-id=497 bgcolor=#E9E9E9
| 323497 ||  || — || August 11, 2004 || Siding Spring || SSS || — || align=right | 3.2 km || 
|-id=498 bgcolor=#FA8072
| 323498 ||  || — || August 19, 2004 || Socorro || LINEAR || — || align=right | 1.4 km || 
|-id=499 bgcolor=#E9E9E9
| 323499 ||  || — || August 16, 2004 || Siding Spring || SSS || — || align=right | 2.8 km || 
|-id=500 bgcolor=#E9E9E9
| 323500 ||  || — || August 16, 2004 || Siding Spring || SSS || JUN || align=right | 1.2 km || 
|}

323501–323600 

|-bgcolor=#d6d6d6
| 323501 ||  || — || August 21, 2004 || Catalina || CSS || — || align=right | 3.8 km || 
|-id=502 bgcolor=#E9E9E9
| 323502 ||  || — || August 21, 2004 || Siding Spring || SSS || CLO || align=right | 4.0 km || 
|-id=503 bgcolor=#d6d6d6
| 323503 ||  || — || August 21, 2004 || Siding Spring || SSS || BRA || align=right | 1.9 km || 
|-id=504 bgcolor=#E9E9E9
| 323504 ||  || — || August 21, 2004 || Siding Spring || SSS || — || align=right | 2.9 km || 
|-id=505 bgcolor=#E9E9E9
| 323505 ||  || — || August 27, 2004 || Anderson Mesa || LONEOS || — || align=right | 3.7 km || 
|-id=506 bgcolor=#d6d6d6
| 323506 ||  || — || August 23, 2004 || Wise || Wise Obs. || TEL || align=right | 1.7 km || 
|-id=507 bgcolor=#E9E9E9
| 323507 ||  || — || September 7, 2004 || Saint-Véran || Saint-Véran Obs. || — || align=right | 1.8 km || 
|-id=508 bgcolor=#d6d6d6
| 323508 ||  || — || September 7, 2004 || Socorro || LINEAR || — || align=right | 3.3 km || 
|-id=509 bgcolor=#d6d6d6
| 323509 ||  || — || September 7, 2004 || Socorro || LINEAR || — || align=right | 3.6 km || 
|-id=510 bgcolor=#d6d6d6
| 323510 ||  || — || September 7, 2004 || Palomar || NEAT || — || align=right | 3.2 km || 
|-id=511 bgcolor=#d6d6d6
| 323511 ||  || — || September 7, 2004 || Kitt Peak || Spacewatch || — || align=right | 4.2 km || 
|-id=512 bgcolor=#E9E9E9
| 323512 ||  || — || September 8, 2004 || Socorro || LINEAR || — || align=right | 3.6 km || 
|-id=513 bgcolor=#d6d6d6
| 323513 ||  || — || September 8, 2004 || Socorro || LINEAR || EOS || align=right | 2.3 km || 
|-id=514 bgcolor=#d6d6d6
| 323514 ||  || — || September 8, 2004 || Socorro || LINEAR || TEL || align=right | 1.7 km || 
|-id=515 bgcolor=#d6d6d6
| 323515 ||  || — || September 8, 2004 || Socorro || LINEAR || — || align=right | 2.8 km || 
|-id=516 bgcolor=#d6d6d6
| 323516 ||  || — || September 8, 2004 || Socorro || LINEAR || — || align=right | 3.4 km || 
|-id=517 bgcolor=#d6d6d6
| 323517 ||  || — || September 8, 2004 || Palomar || NEAT || — || align=right | 3.6 km || 
|-id=518 bgcolor=#E9E9E9
| 323518 ||  || — || September 8, 2004 || Socorro || LINEAR || — || align=right | 4.6 km || 
|-id=519 bgcolor=#E9E9E9
| 323519 ||  || — || September 8, 2004 || Socorro || LINEAR || — || align=right | 2.2 km || 
|-id=520 bgcolor=#d6d6d6
| 323520 ||  || — || September 8, 2004 || Socorro || LINEAR || — || align=right | 3.2 km || 
|-id=521 bgcolor=#E9E9E9
| 323521 ||  || — || September 8, 2004 || Socorro || LINEAR || — || align=right | 2.0 km || 
|-id=522 bgcolor=#E9E9E9
| 323522 ||  || — || September 8, 2004 || Socorro || LINEAR || — || align=right | 3.8 km || 
|-id=523 bgcolor=#d6d6d6
| 323523 ||  || — || September 6, 2004 || Socorro || LINEAR || THB || align=right | 5.4 km || 
|-id=524 bgcolor=#E9E9E9
| 323524 ||  || — || August 10, 2004 || Campo Imperatore || CINEOS || AEO || align=right | 1.3 km || 
|-id=525 bgcolor=#d6d6d6
| 323525 ||  || — || September 7, 2004 || Kitt Peak || Spacewatch || K-2 || align=right | 1.5 km || 
|-id=526 bgcolor=#d6d6d6
| 323526 ||  || — || September 7, 2004 || Kitt Peak || Spacewatch || — || align=right | 3.0 km || 
|-id=527 bgcolor=#d6d6d6
| 323527 ||  || — || September 9, 2004 || Socorro || LINEAR || KOR || align=right | 1.8 km || 
|-id=528 bgcolor=#d6d6d6
| 323528 ||  || — || September 10, 2004 || Socorro || LINEAR || — || align=right | 3.2 km || 
|-id=529 bgcolor=#d6d6d6
| 323529 ||  || — || September 10, 2004 || Socorro || LINEAR || — || align=right | 3.1 km || 
|-id=530 bgcolor=#d6d6d6
| 323530 ||  || — || September 10, 2004 || Socorro || LINEAR || — || align=right | 3.4 km || 
|-id=531 bgcolor=#E9E9E9
| 323531 ||  || — || September 10, 2004 || Socorro || LINEAR || EUN || align=right | 2.1 km || 
|-id=532 bgcolor=#d6d6d6
| 323532 ||  || — || September 10, 2004 || Socorro || LINEAR || NAE || align=right | 2.4 km || 
|-id=533 bgcolor=#d6d6d6
| 323533 ||  || — || September 10, 2004 || Socorro || LINEAR || EOS || align=right | 2.5 km || 
|-id=534 bgcolor=#E9E9E9
| 323534 ||  || — || September 10, 2004 || Socorro || LINEAR || — || align=right | 3.2 km || 
|-id=535 bgcolor=#E9E9E9
| 323535 ||  || — || September 10, 2004 || Socorro || LINEAR || — || align=right | 2.9 km || 
|-id=536 bgcolor=#d6d6d6
| 323536 ||  || — || September 9, 2004 || Kitt Peak || Spacewatch || — || align=right | 3.7 km || 
|-id=537 bgcolor=#d6d6d6
| 323537 ||  || — || September 15, 2004 || Three Buttes || G. R. Jones || EOS || align=right | 2.5 km || 
|-id=538 bgcolor=#d6d6d6
| 323538 ||  || — || September 9, 2004 || Socorro || LINEAR || KOR || align=right | 1.8 km || 
|-id=539 bgcolor=#E9E9E9
| 323539 ||  || — || September 11, 2004 || Kitt Peak || Spacewatch || HOF || align=right | 3.4 km || 
|-id=540 bgcolor=#d6d6d6
| 323540 ||  || — || September 11, 2004 || Kitt Peak || Spacewatch || KOR || align=right | 1.3 km || 
|-id=541 bgcolor=#d6d6d6
| 323541 ||  || — || September 11, 2004 || Kitt Peak || Spacewatch || — || align=right | 2.9 km || 
|-id=542 bgcolor=#d6d6d6
| 323542 ||  || — || September 14, 2004 || Socorro || LINEAR || — || align=right | 3.6 km || 
|-id=543 bgcolor=#d6d6d6
| 323543 ||  || — || September 15, 2004 || Kitt Peak || Spacewatch || 7:4* || align=right | 2.5 km || 
|-id=544 bgcolor=#E9E9E9
| 323544 ||  || — || September 13, 2004 || Socorro || LINEAR || TIN || align=right | 1.4 km || 
|-id=545 bgcolor=#d6d6d6
| 323545 ||  || — || September 7, 2004 || Kitt Peak || Spacewatch || — || align=right | 2.9 km || 
|-id=546 bgcolor=#d6d6d6
| 323546 ||  || — || September 14, 2004 || Anderson Mesa || LONEOS || TRE || align=right | 3.5 km || 
|-id=547 bgcolor=#d6d6d6
| 323547 ||  || — || September 17, 2004 || Anderson Mesa || LONEOS || — || align=right | 3.5 km || 
|-id=548 bgcolor=#d6d6d6
| 323548 ||  || — || September 17, 2004 || Socorro || LINEAR || — || align=right | 4.8 km || 
|-id=549 bgcolor=#E9E9E9
| 323549 ||  || — || September 17, 2004 || Socorro || LINEAR || DOR || align=right | 3.1 km || 
|-id=550 bgcolor=#d6d6d6
| 323550 ||  || — || September 18, 2004 || Socorro || LINEAR || LIX || align=right | 4.8 km || 
|-id=551 bgcolor=#d6d6d6
| 323551 ||  || — || September 18, 2004 || Socorro || LINEAR || — || align=right | 3.4 km || 
|-id=552 bgcolor=#d6d6d6
| 323552 Trudybell || 2004 TB ||  || October 2, 2004 || Wrightwood || J. W. Young || URS || align=right | 3.2 km || 
|-id=553 bgcolor=#d6d6d6
| 323553 ||  || — || October 5, 2004 || Kitt Peak || Spacewatch || EOS || align=right | 2.4 km || 
|-id=554 bgcolor=#d6d6d6
| 323554 ||  || — || October 4, 2004 || Kitt Peak || Spacewatch || BRA || align=right | 1.6 km || 
|-id=555 bgcolor=#d6d6d6
| 323555 ||  || — || October 4, 2004 || Kitt Peak || Spacewatch || — || align=right | 2.9 km || 
|-id=556 bgcolor=#d6d6d6
| 323556 ||  || — || October 4, 2004 || Kitt Peak || Spacewatch || — || align=right | 3.3 km || 
|-id=557 bgcolor=#d6d6d6
| 323557 ||  || — || October 4, 2004 || Kitt Peak || Spacewatch || EOS || align=right | 2.3 km || 
|-id=558 bgcolor=#d6d6d6
| 323558 ||  || — || October 4, 2004 || Kitt Peak || Spacewatch || TEL || align=right | 1.7 km || 
|-id=559 bgcolor=#d6d6d6
| 323559 ||  || — || October 4, 2004 || Kitt Peak || Spacewatch || — || align=right | 3.6 km || 
|-id=560 bgcolor=#d6d6d6
| 323560 ||  || — || October 5, 2004 || Kitt Peak || Spacewatch || — || align=right | 2.6 km || 
|-id=561 bgcolor=#d6d6d6
| 323561 ||  || — || October 6, 2004 || Kitt Peak || Spacewatch || — || align=right | 3.1 km || 
|-id=562 bgcolor=#E9E9E9
| 323562 ||  || — || October 5, 2004 || Kitt Peak || Spacewatch || AGN || align=right | 1.6 km || 
|-id=563 bgcolor=#d6d6d6
| 323563 ||  || — || October 5, 2004 || Kitt Peak || Spacewatch || — || align=right | 3.4 km || 
|-id=564 bgcolor=#E9E9E9
| 323564 ||  || — || October 5, 2004 || Kitt Peak || Spacewatch || HNA || align=right | 2.6 km || 
|-id=565 bgcolor=#d6d6d6
| 323565 ||  || — || October 5, 2004 || Kitt Peak || Spacewatch || — || align=right | 2.4 km || 
|-id=566 bgcolor=#d6d6d6
| 323566 ||  || — || October 5, 2004 || Kitt Peak || Spacewatch || — || align=right | 3.3 km || 
|-id=567 bgcolor=#d6d6d6
| 323567 ||  || — || October 5, 2004 || Kitt Peak || Spacewatch || EOS || align=right | 2.5 km || 
|-id=568 bgcolor=#d6d6d6
| 323568 ||  || — || October 6, 2004 || Palomar || NEAT || FIR || align=right | 4.4 km || 
|-id=569 bgcolor=#d6d6d6
| 323569 ||  || — || October 7, 2004 || Kitt Peak || Spacewatch || — || align=right | 3.3 km || 
|-id=570 bgcolor=#d6d6d6
| 323570 ||  || — || October 8, 2004 || Anderson Mesa || LONEOS || — || align=right | 3.2 km || 
|-id=571 bgcolor=#d6d6d6
| 323571 ||  || — || October 4, 2004 || Anderson Mesa || LONEOS || — || align=right | 4.2 km || 
|-id=572 bgcolor=#E9E9E9
| 323572 ||  || — || October 7, 2004 || Socorro || LINEAR || DOR || align=right | 3.6 km || 
|-id=573 bgcolor=#d6d6d6
| 323573 ||  || — || October 7, 2004 || Palomar || NEAT || EOS || align=right | 2.5 km || 
|-id=574 bgcolor=#d6d6d6
| 323574 ||  || — || October 4, 2004 || Kitt Peak || Spacewatch || TRP || align=right | 3.3 km || 
|-id=575 bgcolor=#d6d6d6
| 323575 ||  || — || October 6, 2004 || Kitt Peak || Spacewatch || — || align=right | 3.6 km || 
|-id=576 bgcolor=#d6d6d6
| 323576 ||  || — || October 8, 2004 || Socorro || LINEAR || — || align=right | 3.7 km || 
|-id=577 bgcolor=#d6d6d6
| 323577 ||  || — || October 8, 2004 || Socorro || LINEAR || EOS || align=right | 3.0 km || 
|-id=578 bgcolor=#E9E9E9
| 323578 ||  || — || October 7, 2004 || Kitt Peak || Spacewatch || DOR || align=right | 3.1 km || 
|-id=579 bgcolor=#d6d6d6
| 323579 ||  || — || October 7, 2004 || Kitt Peak || Spacewatch || — || align=right | 2.3 km || 
|-id=580 bgcolor=#d6d6d6
| 323580 ||  || — || October 7, 2004 || Kitt Peak || Spacewatch || — || align=right | 3.4 km || 
|-id=581 bgcolor=#d6d6d6
| 323581 ||  || — || October 7, 2004 || Kitt Peak || Spacewatch || EOS || align=right | 2.0 km || 
|-id=582 bgcolor=#d6d6d6
| 323582 ||  || — || October 7, 2004 || Kitt Peak || Spacewatch || — || align=right | 3.1 km || 
|-id=583 bgcolor=#E9E9E9
| 323583 ||  || — || October 8, 2004 || Kitt Peak || Spacewatch || — || align=right | 2.3 km || 
|-id=584 bgcolor=#d6d6d6
| 323584 ||  || — || October 9, 2004 || Kitt Peak || Spacewatch || KOR || align=right | 1.5 km || 
|-id=585 bgcolor=#d6d6d6
| 323585 ||  || — || October 10, 2004 || Kitt Peak || Spacewatch || CHA || align=right | 2.3 km || 
|-id=586 bgcolor=#d6d6d6
| 323586 ||  || — || October 8, 2004 || Kitt Peak || Spacewatch || HYG || align=right | 2.7 km || 
|-id=587 bgcolor=#d6d6d6
| 323587 ||  || — || October 8, 2004 || Kitt Peak || Spacewatch || — || align=right | 2.6 km || 
|-id=588 bgcolor=#d6d6d6
| 323588 ||  || — || October 9, 2004 || Kitt Peak || Spacewatch || — || align=right | 4.3 km || 
|-id=589 bgcolor=#d6d6d6
| 323589 ||  || — || October 9, 2004 || Kitt Peak || Spacewatch || EOS || align=right | 1.7 km || 
|-id=590 bgcolor=#E9E9E9
| 323590 ||  || — || October 9, 2004 || Kitt Peak || Spacewatch || — || align=right | 3.3 km || 
|-id=591 bgcolor=#d6d6d6
| 323591 ||  || — || October 9, 2004 || Kitt Peak || Spacewatch || EOS || align=right | 2.3 km || 
|-id=592 bgcolor=#d6d6d6
| 323592 ||  || — || October 9, 2004 || Kitt Peak || Spacewatch || — || align=right | 4.1 km || 
|-id=593 bgcolor=#d6d6d6
| 323593 ||  || — || October 9, 2004 || Kitt Peak || Spacewatch || — || align=right | 4.7 km || 
|-id=594 bgcolor=#d6d6d6
| 323594 ||  || — || October 10, 2004 || Kitt Peak || Spacewatch || HYG || align=right | 3.3 km || 
|-id=595 bgcolor=#d6d6d6
| 323595 ||  || — || October 10, 2004 || Kitt Peak || Spacewatch || THM || align=right | 2.6 km || 
|-id=596 bgcolor=#d6d6d6
| 323596 ||  || — || October 10, 2004 || Kitt Peak || Spacewatch || — || align=right | 3.3 km || 
|-id=597 bgcolor=#d6d6d6
| 323597 ||  || — || October 10, 2004 || Kitt Peak || Spacewatch || — || align=right | 3.7 km || 
|-id=598 bgcolor=#d6d6d6
| 323598 ||  || — || October 10, 2004 || Kitt Peak || Spacewatch || — || align=right | 3.5 km || 
|-id=599 bgcolor=#d6d6d6
| 323599 ||  || — || October 9, 2004 || Socorro || LINEAR || — || align=right | 2.9 km || 
|-id=600 bgcolor=#d6d6d6
| 323600 ||  || — || October 14, 2004 || Palomar || NEAT || — || align=right | 4.0 km || 
|}

323601–323700 

|-bgcolor=#d6d6d6
| 323601 ||  || — || October 15, 2004 || Anderson Mesa || LONEOS || EUP || align=right | 4.1 km || 
|-id=602 bgcolor=#d6d6d6
| 323602 ||  || — || October 4, 2004 || Palomar || NEAT || — || align=right | 4.9 km || 
|-id=603 bgcolor=#d6d6d6
| 323603 ||  || — || October 9, 2004 || Kitt Peak || Spacewatch || — || align=right | 3.2 km || 
|-id=604 bgcolor=#d6d6d6
| 323604 ||  || — || October 9, 2004 || Kitt Peak || Spacewatch || EOS || align=right | 2.2 km || 
|-id=605 bgcolor=#d6d6d6
| 323605 ||  || — || October 15, 2004 || Mount Lemmon || Mount Lemmon Survey || — || align=right | 4.0 km || 
|-id=606 bgcolor=#d6d6d6
| 323606 ||  || — || October 15, 2004 || Anderson Mesa || LONEOS || THB || align=right | 3.4 km || 
|-id=607 bgcolor=#d6d6d6
| 323607 ||  || — || October 15, 2004 || Anderson Mesa || LONEOS || EOS || align=right | 2.5 km || 
|-id=608 bgcolor=#d6d6d6
| 323608 ||  || — || October 7, 2004 || Socorro || LINEAR || — || align=right | 4.4 km || 
|-id=609 bgcolor=#d6d6d6
| 323609 ||  || — || October 7, 2004 || Socorro || LINEAR || EOS || align=right | 2.7 km || 
|-id=610 bgcolor=#d6d6d6
| 323610 ||  || — || October 14, 2004 || Anderson Mesa || LONEOS || — || align=right | 4.0 km || 
|-id=611 bgcolor=#d6d6d6
| 323611 ||  || — || October 13, 2004 || Kitt Peak || Spacewatch || — || align=right | 3.8 km || 
|-id=612 bgcolor=#d6d6d6
| 323612 ||  || — || October 8, 2004 || Kitt Peak || Spacewatch || — || align=right | 3.8 km || 
|-id=613 bgcolor=#d6d6d6
| 323613 ||  || — || October 20, 2004 || Socorro || LINEAR || — || align=right | 4.1 km || 
|-id=614 bgcolor=#d6d6d6
| 323614 ||  || — || November 3, 2004 || Kitt Peak || Spacewatch || — || align=right | 4.3 km || 
|-id=615 bgcolor=#d6d6d6
| 323615 ||  || — || September 21, 2004 || Anderson Mesa || LONEOS || THB || align=right | 4.6 km || 
|-id=616 bgcolor=#d6d6d6
| 323616 ||  || — || November 4, 2004 || Anderson Mesa || LONEOS || — || align=right | 4.6 km || 
|-id=617 bgcolor=#d6d6d6
| 323617 ||  || — || November 4, 2004 || Catalina || CSS || — || align=right | 4.5 km || 
|-id=618 bgcolor=#d6d6d6
| 323618 ||  || — || November 3, 2004 || Kitt Peak || Spacewatch || VER || align=right | 3.0 km || 
|-id=619 bgcolor=#d6d6d6
| 323619 ||  || — || November 3, 2004 || Kitt Peak || Spacewatch || — || align=right | 4.0 km || 
|-id=620 bgcolor=#d6d6d6
| 323620 ||  || — || November 4, 2004 || Kitt Peak || Spacewatch || HYG || align=right | 3.3 km || 
|-id=621 bgcolor=#d6d6d6
| 323621 ||  || — || November 4, 2004 || Kitt Peak || Spacewatch || — || align=right | 2.9 km || 
|-id=622 bgcolor=#d6d6d6
| 323622 ||  || — || November 4, 2004 || Socorro || LINEAR || — || align=right | 3.9 km || 
|-id=623 bgcolor=#d6d6d6
| 323623 ||  || — || November 4, 2004 || Socorro || LINEAR || — || align=right | 4.3 km || 
|-id=624 bgcolor=#d6d6d6
| 323624 ||  || — || November 9, 2004 || Goodricke-Pigott || R. A. Tucker || EOS || align=right | 3.4 km || 
|-id=625 bgcolor=#d6d6d6
| 323625 ||  || — || November 5, 2004 || Socorro || LINEAR || THB || align=right | 4.6 km || 
|-id=626 bgcolor=#d6d6d6
| 323626 ||  || — || November 5, 2004 || Palomar || NEAT || HYG || align=right | 3.7 km || 
|-id=627 bgcolor=#d6d6d6
| 323627 ||  || — || November 12, 2004 || Catalina || CSS || HYG || align=right | 3.7 km || 
|-id=628 bgcolor=#d6d6d6
| 323628 ||  || — || November 3, 2004 || Kitt Peak || Spacewatch || THM || align=right | 2.1 km || 
|-id=629 bgcolor=#d6d6d6
| 323629 ||  || — || November 4, 2004 || Kitt Peak || Spacewatch || — || align=right | 4.7 km || 
|-id=630 bgcolor=#d6d6d6
| 323630 ||  || — || November 3, 2004 || Catalina || CSS || — || align=right | 3.8 km || 
|-id=631 bgcolor=#d6d6d6
| 323631 ||  || — || November 10, 2004 || Goodricke-Pigott || R. A. Tucker || — || align=right | 3.7 km || 
|-id=632 bgcolor=#d6d6d6
| 323632 ||  || — || November 17, 2004 || Campo Imperatore || CINEOS || — || align=right | 4.7 km || 
|-id=633 bgcolor=#d6d6d6
| 323633 ||  || — || December 1, 2004 || Palomar || NEAT || — || align=right | 3.6 km || 
|-id=634 bgcolor=#d6d6d6
| 323634 ||  || — || December 2, 2004 || Socorro || LINEAR || — || align=right | 4.9 km || 
|-id=635 bgcolor=#d6d6d6
| 323635 ||  || — || December 2, 2004 || Palomar || NEAT || — || align=right | 3.0 km || 
|-id=636 bgcolor=#d6d6d6
| 323636 ||  || — || December 8, 2004 || Socorro || LINEAR || — || align=right | 3.1 km || 
|-id=637 bgcolor=#d6d6d6
| 323637 ||  || — || December 10, 2004 || Socorro || LINEAR || — || align=right | 4.5 km || 
|-id=638 bgcolor=#fefefe
| 323638 ||  || — || December 9, 2004 || Bergisch Gladbac || W. Bickel || FLO || align=right data-sort-value="0.73" | 730 m || 
|-id=639 bgcolor=#d6d6d6
| 323639 ||  || — || December 8, 2004 || Needville || Needville Obs. || — || align=right | 4.3 km || 
|-id=640 bgcolor=#d6d6d6
| 323640 ||  || — || December 10, 2004 || Socorro || LINEAR || — || align=right | 3.9 km || 
|-id=641 bgcolor=#d6d6d6
| 323641 ||  || — || December 14, 2004 || Kitt Peak || Spacewatch || — || align=right | 4.6 km || 
|-id=642 bgcolor=#d6d6d6
| 323642 ||  || — || December 10, 2004 || Kitt Peak || Spacewatch || VER || align=right | 4.4 km || 
|-id=643 bgcolor=#d6d6d6
| 323643 ||  || — || December 11, 2004 || Calvin-Rehoboth || L. A. Molnar || VER || align=right | 3.1 km || 
|-id=644 bgcolor=#d6d6d6
| 323644 ||  || — || December 14, 2004 || Kitt Peak || Spacewatch || VER || align=right | 3.6 km || 
|-id=645 bgcolor=#fefefe
| 323645 ||  || — || December 16, 2004 || Kitt Peak || Spacewatch || FLO || align=right data-sort-value="0.76" | 760 m || 
|-id=646 bgcolor=#fefefe
| 323646 ||  || — || December 18, 2004 || Mount Lemmon || Mount Lemmon Survey || — || align=right | 1.00 km || 
|-id=647 bgcolor=#fefefe
| 323647 ||  || — || December 18, 2004 || Mount Lemmon || Mount Lemmon Survey || — || align=right data-sort-value="0.79" | 790 m || 
|-id=648 bgcolor=#fefefe
| 323648 ||  || — || January 6, 2005 || Begues || J. Manteca || — || align=right data-sort-value="0.89" | 890 m || 
|-id=649 bgcolor=#fefefe
| 323649 ||  || — || January 13, 2005 || Kitt Peak || Spacewatch || — || align=right | 1.0 km || 
|-id=650 bgcolor=#fefefe
| 323650 ||  || — || January 16, 2005 || Kitt Peak || Spacewatch || — || align=right | 1.0 km || 
|-id=651 bgcolor=#fefefe
| 323651 ||  || — || January 16, 2005 || Kitt Peak || Spacewatch || — || align=right data-sort-value="0.62" | 620 m || 
|-id=652 bgcolor=#fefefe
| 323652 ||  || — || January 31, 2005 || Palomar || NEAT || — || align=right | 1.0 km || 
|-id=653 bgcolor=#fefefe
| 323653 ||  || — || February 1, 2005 || Catalina || CSS || — || align=right | 1.6 km || 
|-id=654 bgcolor=#fefefe
| 323654 ||  || — || February 1, 2005 || Kitt Peak || Spacewatch || — || align=right data-sort-value="0.65" | 650 m || 
|-id=655 bgcolor=#d6d6d6
| 323655 ||  || — || February 2, 2005 || Kitt Peak || Spacewatch || 7:4 || align=right | 3.9 km || 
|-id=656 bgcolor=#fefefe
| 323656 ||  || — || February 3, 2005 || Socorro || LINEAR || — || align=right data-sort-value="0.77" | 770 m || 
|-id=657 bgcolor=#fefefe
| 323657 ||  || — || February 1, 2005 || Kitt Peak || Spacewatch || FLO || align=right data-sort-value="0.57" | 570 m || 
|-id=658 bgcolor=#fefefe
| 323658 ||  || — || March 1, 2005 || Kitt Peak || Spacewatch || — || align=right | 1.1 km || 
|-id=659 bgcolor=#fefefe
| 323659 ||  || — || March 1, 2005 || Kitt Peak || Spacewatch || — || align=right | 2.6 km || 
|-id=660 bgcolor=#fefefe
| 323660 ||  || — || March 1, 2005 || Kitt Peak || Spacewatch || — || align=right data-sort-value="0.75" | 750 m || 
|-id=661 bgcolor=#fefefe
| 323661 ||  || — || March 3, 2005 || Catalina || CSS || V || align=right data-sort-value="0.64" | 640 m || 
|-id=662 bgcolor=#fefefe
| 323662 ||  || — || March 3, 2005 || Catalina || CSS || — || align=right data-sort-value="0.94" | 940 m || 
|-id=663 bgcolor=#fefefe
| 323663 ||  || — || March 3, 2005 || Socorro || LINEAR || PHO || align=right | 1.2 km || 
|-id=664 bgcolor=#fefefe
| 323664 ||  || — || March 3, 2005 || Kitt Peak || Spacewatch || NYS || align=right data-sort-value="0.67" | 670 m || 
|-id=665 bgcolor=#fefefe
| 323665 ||  || — || March 3, 2005 || Catalina || CSS || — || align=right data-sort-value="0.92" | 920 m || 
|-id=666 bgcolor=#fefefe
| 323666 ||  || — || March 4, 2005 || Kitt Peak || Spacewatch || NYS || align=right data-sort-value="0.68" | 680 m || 
|-id=667 bgcolor=#fefefe
| 323667 ||  || — || March 4, 2005 || Kitt Peak || Spacewatch || FLO || align=right data-sort-value="0.65" | 650 m || 
|-id=668 bgcolor=#fefefe
| 323668 ||  || — || March 4, 2005 || Mount Lemmon || Mount Lemmon Survey || — || align=right data-sort-value="0.68" | 680 m || 
|-id=669 bgcolor=#fefefe
| 323669 ||  || — || March 8, 2005 || Mount Lemmon || Mount Lemmon Survey || — || align=right data-sort-value="0.85" | 850 m || 
|-id=670 bgcolor=#fefefe
| 323670 ||  || — || March 4, 2005 || Mount Lemmon || Mount Lemmon Survey || — || align=right data-sort-value="0.68" | 680 m || 
|-id=671 bgcolor=#fefefe
| 323671 ||  || — || March 9, 2005 || Mount Lemmon || Mount Lemmon Survey || — || align=right data-sort-value="0.80" | 800 m || 
|-id=672 bgcolor=#fefefe
| 323672 ||  || — || March 10, 2005 || Mount Lemmon || Mount Lemmon Survey || — || align=right data-sort-value="0.89" | 890 m || 
|-id=673 bgcolor=#fefefe
| 323673 ||  || — || March 10, 2005 || Mount Lemmon || Mount Lemmon Survey || — || align=right data-sort-value="0.80" | 800 m || 
|-id=674 bgcolor=#fefefe
| 323674 ||  || — || March 9, 2005 || Mount Lemmon || Mount Lemmon Survey || V || align=right data-sort-value="0.51" | 510 m || 
|-id=675 bgcolor=#fefefe
| 323675 ||  || — || March 11, 2005 || Catalina || CSS || — || align=right data-sort-value="0.86" | 860 m || 
|-id=676 bgcolor=#fefefe
| 323676 ||  || — || March 9, 2005 || Kitt Peak || Spacewatch || — || align=right | 1.2 km || 
|-id=677 bgcolor=#fefefe
| 323677 ||  || — || March 11, 2005 || Mount Lemmon || Mount Lemmon Survey || NYS || align=right data-sort-value="0.71" | 710 m || 
|-id=678 bgcolor=#fefefe
| 323678 ||  || — || March 10, 2005 || Catalina || CSS || NYS || align=right data-sort-value="0.75" | 750 m || 
|-id=679 bgcolor=#fefefe
| 323679 ||  || — || March 10, 2005 || Catalina || CSS || — || align=right data-sort-value="0.96" | 960 m || 
|-id=680 bgcolor=#fefefe
| 323680 ||  || — || March 10, 2005 || Mount Lemmon || Mount Lemmon Survey || — || align=right data-sort-value="0.57" | 570 m || 
|-id=681 bgcolor=#fefefe
| 323681 ||  || — || March 11, 2005 || Socorro || LINEAR || — || align=right | 1.0 km || 
|-id=682 bgcolor=#fefefe
| 323682 ||  || — || March 10, 2005 || Goodricke-Pigott || R. A. Tucker || — || align=right data-sort-value="0.89" | 890 m || 
|-id=683 bgcolor=#fefefe
| 323683 ||  || — || March 3, 2005 || Kitt Peak || Spacewatch || V || align=right data-sort-value="0.79" | 790 m || 
|-id=684 bgcolor=#fefefe
| 323684 ||  || — || March 30, 2005 || Catalina || CSS || — || align=right | 2.9 km || 
|-id=685 bgcolor=#d6d6d6
| 323685 ||  || — || April 1, 2005 || Kitt Peak || Spacewatch || 3:2 || align=right | 5.8 km || 
|-id=686 bgcolor=#FA8072
| 323686 ||  || — || April 3, 2005 || Socorro || LINEAR || PHO || align=right | 1.2 km || 
|-id=687 bgcolor=#fefefe
| 323687 ||  || — || April 4, 2005 || Catalina || CSS || PHO || align=right data-sort-value="0.91" | 910 m || 
|-id=688 bgcolor=#fefefe
| 323688 ||  || — || April 6, 2005 || Kitt Peak || Spacewatch || — || align=right data-sort-value="0.67" | 670 m || 
|-id=689 bgcolor=#fefefe
| 323689 ||  || — || April 6, 2005 || Mount Lemmon || Mount Lemmon Survey || FLO || align=right data-sort-value="0.60" | 600 m || 
|-id=690 bgcolor=#fefefe
| 323690 ||  || — || April 7, 2005 || Kitt Peak || Spacewatch || — || align=right data-sort-value="0.66" | 660 m || 
|-id=691 bgcolor=#fefefe
| 323691 ||  || — || April 4, 2005 || Mount Lemmon || Mount Lemmon Survey || — || align=right data-sort-value="0.71" | 710 m || 
|-id=692 bgcolor=#fefefe
| 323692 ||  || — || April 4, 2005 || Kitt Peak || Spacewatch || — || align=right data-sort-value="0.87" | 870 m || 
|-id=693 bgcolor=#fefefe
| 323693 ||  || — || April 4, 2005 || Socorro || LINEAR || — || align=right data-sort-value="0.87" | 870 m || 
|-id=694 bgcolor=#fefefe
| 323694 ||  || — || April 5, 2005 || Mount Lemmon || Mount Lemmon Survey || — || align=right data-sort-value="0.81" | 810 m || 
|-id=695 bgcolor=#fefefe
| 323695 ||  || — || April 6, 2005 || Kitt Peak || Spacewatch || PHO || align=right | 3.0 km || 
|-id=696 bgcolor=#fefefe
| 323696 ||  || — || April 7, 2005 || Kitt Peak || Spacewatch || — || align=right data-sort-value="0.75" | 750 m || 
|-id=697 bgcolor=#fefefe
| 323697 ||  || — || April 10, 2005 || Mount Lemmon || Mount Lemmon Survey || — || align=right data-sort-value="0.92" | 920 m || 
|-id=698 bgcolor=#fefefe
| 323698 ||  || — || April 6, 2005 || Kitt Peak || Spacewatch || — || align=right data-sort-value="0.76" | 760 m || 
|-id=699 bgcolor=#fefefe
| 323699 ||  || — || April 11, 2005 || Kitt Peak || Spacewatch || — || align=right data-sort-value="0.75" | 750 m || 
|-id=700 bgcolor=#fefefe
| 323700 ||  || — || April 1, 2005 || Anderson Mesa || LONEOS || — || align=right | 1.3 km || 
|}

323701–323800 

|-bgcolor=#fefefe
| 323701 ||  || — || April 12, 2005 || Mount Lemmon || Mount Lemmon Survey || — || align=right data-sort-value="0.85" | 850 m || 
|-id=702 bgcolor=#fefefe
| 323702 ||  || — || April 10, 2005 || Kitt Peak || Spacewatch || — || align=right | 1.2 km || 
|-id=703 bgcolor=#fefefe
| 323703 ||  || — || April 13, 2005 || Kitt Peak || Spacewatch || — || align=right data-sort-value="0.87" | 870 m || 
|-id=704 bgcolor=#fefefe
| 323704 ||  || — || April 13, 2005 || Socorro || LINEAR || PHO || align=right | 1.1 km || 
|-id=705 bgcolor=#fefefe
| 323705 ||  || — || April 13, 2005 || Anderson Mesa || LONEOS || — || align=right data-sort-value="0.78" | 780 m || 
|-id=706 bgcolor=#fefefe
| 323706 ||  || — || April 13, 2005 || Catalina || CSS || — || align=right | 1.1 km || 
|-id=707 bgcolor=#fefefe
| 323707 ||  || — || April 11, 2005 || Mount Lemmon || Mount Lemmon Survey || — || align=right data-sort-value="0.87" | 870 m || 
|-id=708 bgcolor=#fefefe
| 323708 ||  || — || April 15, 2005 || Anderson Mesa || LONEOS || — || align=right data-sort-value="0.87" | 870 m || 
|-id=709 bgcolor=#fefefe
| 323709 ||  || — || April 30, 2005 || Kitt Peak || Spacewatch || — || align=right data-sort-value="0.85" | 850 m || 
|-id=710 bgcolor=#fefefe
| 323710 ||  || — || April 30, 2005 || Kitt Peak || Spacewatch || NYS || align=right data-sort-value="0.78" | 780 m || 
|-id=711 bgcolor=#fefefe
| 323711 ||  || — || May 3, 2005 || Socorro || LINEAR || — || align=right data-sort-value="0.95" | 950 m || 
|-id=712 bgcolor=#fefefe
| 323712 ||  || — || May 3, 2005 || Kitt Peak || Spacewatch || — || align=right | 1.1 km || 
|-id=713 bgcolor=#fefefe
| 323713 ||  || — || May 1, 2005 || Palomar || NEAT || — || align=right data-sort-value="0.81" | 810 m || 
|-id=714 bgcolor=#fefefe
| 323714 ||  || — || May 4, 2005 || Anderson Mesa || LONEOS || — || align=right | 1.0 km || 
|-id=715 bgcolor=#fefefe
| 323715 ||  || — || May 4, 2005 || Mount Lemmon || Mount Lemmon Survey || NYS || align=right data-sort-value="0.71" | 710 m || 
|-id=716 bgcolor=#fefefe
| 323716 ||  || — || May 4, 2005 || Mount Lemmon || Mount Lemmon Survey || MAS || align=right data-sort-value="0.74" | 740 m || 
|-id=717 bgcolor=#fefefe
| 323717 ||  || — || May 4, 2005 || Kitt Peak || Spacewatch || — || align=right | 1.1 km || 
|-id=718 bgcolor=#fefefe
| 323718 ||  || — || May 4, 2005 || Kitt Peak || Spacewatch || V || align=right data-sort-value="0.78" | 780 m || 
|-id=719 bgcolor=#fefefe
| 323719 ||  || — || May 7, 2005 || Mount Lemmon || Mount Lemmon Survey || — || align=right data-sort-value="0.76" | 760 m || 
|-id=720 bgcolor=#fefefe
| 323720 ||  || — || May 3, 2005 || Kitt Peak || Spacewatch || — || align=right data-sort-value="0.66" | 660 m || 
|-id=721 bgcolor=#fefefe
| 323721 ||  || — || May 4, 2005 || Kitt Peak || Spacewatch || NYS || align=right data-sort-value="0.90" | 900 m || 
|-id=722 bgcolor=#fefefe
| 323722 ||  || — || May 4, 2005 || Kitt Peak || Spacewatch || — || align=right | 1.1 km || 
|-id=723 bgcolor=#fefefe
| 323723 ||  || — || May 7, 2005 || Kitt Peak || Spacewatch || MAS || align=right data-sort-value="0.67" | 670 m || 
|-id=724 bgcolor=#fefefe
| 323724 ||  || — || May 12, 2005 || Anderson Mesa || LONEOS || — || align=right | 1.3 km || 
|-id=725 bgcolor=#fefefe
| 323725 ||  || — || May 10, 2005 || Kitt Peak || Spacewatch || SUL || align=right | 2.1 km || 
|-id=726 bgcolor=#E9E9E9
| 323726 ||  || — || May 12, 2005 || Palomar || NEAT || — || align=right | 2.3 km || 
|-id=727 bgcolor=#fefefe
| 323727 ||  || — || May 4, 2005 || Mount Lemmon || Mount Lemmon Survey || NYS || align=right data-sort-value="0.62" | 620 m || 
|-id=728 bgcolor=#fefefe
| 323728 ||  || — || May 4, 2005 || Mount Lemmon || Mount Lemmon Survey || — || align=right data-sort-value="0.94" | 940 m || 
|-id=729 bgcolor=#fefefe
| 323729 ||  || — || May 11, 2005 || Anderson Mesa || LONEOS || ERI || align=right | 1.7 km || 
|-id=730 bgcolor=#fefefe
| 323730 ||  || — || June 1, 2005 || Kitt Peak || Spacewatch || V || align=right data-sort-value="0.73" | 730 m || 
|-id=731 bgcolor=#fefefe
| 323731 ||  || — || June 6, 2005 || Kitt Peak || Spacewatch || MAS || align=right data-sort-value="0.83" | 830 m || 
|-id=732 bgcolor=#fefefe
| 323732 ||  || — || June 6, 2005 || Kitt Peak || Spacewatch || — || align=right | 1.3 km || 
|-id=733 bgcolor=#fefefe
| 323733 ||  || — || June 6, 2005 || Kitt Peak || Spacewatch || — || align=right data-sort-value="0.84" | 840 m || 
|-id=734 bgcolor=#fefefe
| 323734 ||  || — || June 10, 2005 || Kitt Peak || Spacewatch || NYS || align=right data-sort-value="0.65" | 650 m || 
|-id=735 bgcolor=#fefefe
| 323735 ||  || — || June 8, 2005 || Kitt Peak || Spacewatch || — || align=right data-sort-value="0.97" | 970 m || 
|-id=736 bgcolor=#fefefe
| 323736 ||  || — || June 12, 2005 || Kitt Peak || Spacewatch || NYS || align=right data-sort-value="0.81" | 810 m || 
|-id=737 bgcolor=#fefefe
| 323737 ||  || — || June 28, 2005 || Kitt Peak || Spacewatch || NYS || align=right data-sort-value="0.79" | 790 m || 
|-id=738 bgcolor=#E9E9E9
| 323738 ||  || — || June 27, 2005 || Kitt Peak || Spacewatch || — || align=right | 1.1 km || 
|-id=739 bgcolor=#fefefe
| 323739 ||  || — || June 30, 2005 || Kitt Peak || Spacewatch || — || align=right | 1.0 km || 
|-id=740 bgcolor=#fefefe
| 323740 ||  || — || June 23, 2005 || Palomar || NEAT || — || align=right | 1.3 km || 
|-id=741 bgcolor=#E9E9E9
| 323741 ||  || — || June 29, 2005 || Kitt Peak || Spacewatch || MAR || align=right | 1.4 km || 
|-id=742 bgcolor=#fefefe
| 323742 ||  || — || June 28, 2005 || Palomar || NEAT || — || align=right | 1.0 km || 
|-id=743 bgcolor=#E9E9E9
| 323743 ||  || — || June 27, 2005 || Kitt Peak || Spacewatch || — || align=right | 1.3 km || 
|-id=744 bgcolor=#E9E9E9
| 323744 ||  || — || June 29, 2005 || Kitt Peak || Spacewatch || — || align=right | 1.1 km || 
|-id=745 bgcolor=#E9E9E9
| 323745 ||  || — || June 29, 2005 || Palomar || NEAT || — || align=right | 1.7 km || 
|-id=746 bgcolor=#E9E9E9
| 323746 ||  || — || June 18, 2005 || Mount Lemmon || Mount Lemmon Survey || EUN || align=right | 1.7 km || 
|-id=747 bgcolor=#fefefe
| 323747 ||  || — || June 27, 2005 || Kitt Peak || Spacewatch || MAS || align=right data-sort-value="0.82" | 820 m || 
|-id=748 bgcolor=#fefefe
| 323748 ||  || — || July 5, 2005 || Mount Lemmon || Mount Lemmon Survey || — || align=right data-sort-value="0.98" | 980 m || 
|-id=749 bgcolor=#fefefe
| 323749 ||  || — || July 5, 2005 || Palomar || NEAT || V || align=right data-sort-value="0.79" | 790 m || 
|-id=750 bgcolor=#fefefe
| 323750 ||  || — || July 10, 2005 || Kitt Peak || Spacewatch || — || align=right | 1.4 km || 
|-id=751 bgcolor=#fefefe
| 323751 ||  || — || July 3, 2005 || Palomar || NEAT || — || align=right | 1.1 km || 
|-id=752 bgcolor=#fefefe
| 323752 ||  || — || July 5, 2005 || Siding Spring || SSS || — || align=right | 1.1 km || 
|-id=753 bgcolor=#E9E9E9
| 323753 ||  || — || July 16, 2005 || Kitt Peak || Spacewatch || — || align=right | 1.4 km || 
|-id=754 bgcolor=#E9E9E9
| 323754 ||  || — || July 28, 2005 || Reedy Creek || J. Broughton || — || align=right | 1.4 km || 
|-id=755 bgcolor=#E9E9E9
| 323755 ||  || — || July 28, 2005 || Palomar || NEAT || MAR || align=right | 1.5 km || 
|-id=756 bgcolor=#E9E9E9
| 323756 ||  || — || July 28, 2005 || Palomar || NEAT || — || align=right | 2.1 km || 
|-id=757 bgcolor=#E9E9E9
| 323757 ||  || — || July 27, 2005 || Palomar || NEAT || — || align=right | 1.4 km || 
|-id=758 bgcolor=#fefefe
| 323758 ||  || — || July 30, 2005 || Palomar || NEAT || — || align=right | 1.2 km || 
|-id=759 bgcolor=#E9E9E9
| 323759 ||  || — || July 28, 2005 || Palomar || NEAT || — || align=right | 1.3 km || 
|-id=760 bgcolor=#fefefe
| 323760 ||  || — || July 31, 2005 || Siding Spring || SSS || NYS || align=right data-sort-value="0.85" | 850 m || 
|-id=761 bgcolor=#fefefe
| 323761 ||  || — || July 29, 2005 || Anderson Mesa || LONEOS || — || align=right | 1.1 km || 
|-id=762 bgcolor=#E9E9E9
| 323762 ||  || — || July 27, 2005 || Palomar || NEAT || — || align=right | 2.2 km || 
|-id=763 bgcolor=#E9E9E9
| 323763 ||  || — || August 6, 2005 || Siding Spring || SSS || ADE || align=right | 2.8 km || 
|-id=764 bgcolor=#E9E9E9
| 323764 ||  || — || August 1, 2005 || Siding Spring || SSS || — || align=right | 2.0 km || 
|-id=765 bgcolor=#fefefe
| 323765 ||  || — || August 11, 2005 || Reedy Creek || J. Broughton || — || align=right | 1.1 km || 
|-id=766 bgcolor=#E9E9E9
| 323766 ||  || — || August 24, 2005 || Palomar || NEAT || — || align=right | 1.3 km || 
|-id=767 bgcolor=#E9E9E9
| 323767 ||  || — || August 25, 2005 || Palomar || NEAT || ADE || align=right | 2.2 km || 
|-id=768 bgcolor=#E9E9E9
| 323768 ||  || — || August 25, 2005 || Campo Imperatore || CINEOS || — || align=right | 1.4 km || 
|-id=769 bgcolor=#E9E9E9
| 323769 ||  || — || August 26, 2005 || Campo Imperatore || CINEOS || — || align=right data-sort-value="0.82" | 820 m || 
|-id=770 bgcolor=#E9E9E9
| 323770 ||  || — || August 27, 2005 || Kitt Peak || Spacewatch || — || align=right | 1.6 km || 
|-id=771 bgcolor=#E9E9E9
| 323771 ||  || — || August 25, 2005 || Palomar || NEAT || — || align=right | 1.2 km || 
|-id=772 bgcolor=#E9E9E9
| 323772 ||  || — || August 25, 2005 || Palomar || NEAT || — || align=right | 2.7 km || 
|-id=773 bgcolor=#E9E9E9
| 323773 ||  || — || August 25, 2005 || Campo Imperatore || CINEOS || RAF || align=right | 1.0 km || 
|-id=774 bgcolor=#fefefe
| 323774 ||  || — || August 26, 2005 || Anderson Mesa || LONEOS || — || align=right | 1.3 km || 
|-id=775 bgcolor=#d6d6d6
| 323775 ||  || — || August 26, 2005 || Palomar || NEAT || 3:2 || align=right | 6.4 km || 
|-id=776 bgcolor=#E9E9E9
| 323776 ||  || — || August 26, 2005 || Palomar || NEAT || — || align=right | 1.0 km || 
|-id=777 bgcolor=#E9E9E9
| 323777 ||  || — || August 26, 2005 || Palomar || NEAT || EUN || align=right | 1.4 km || 
|-id=778 bgcolor=#E9E9E9
| 323778 ||  || — || August 28, 2005 || Kitt Peak || Spacewatch || — || align=right | 2.3 km || 
|-id=779 bgcolor=#E9E9E9
| 323779 ||  || — || August 28, 2005 || Kitt Peak || Spacewatch || EUN || align=right | 1.5 km || 
|-id=780 bgcolor=#E9E9E9
| 323780 ||  || — || August 26, 2005 || Anderson Mesa || LONEOS || — || align=right | 2.5 km || 
|-id=781 bgcolor=#E9E9E9
| 323781 ||  || — || August 26, 2005 || Palomar || NEAT || — || align=right | 1.8 km || 
|-id=782 bgcolor=#fefefe
| 323782 ||  || — || August 26, 2005 || Haleakala || NEAT || H || align=right | 1.2 km || 
|-id=783 bgcolor=#E9E9E9
| 323783 ||  || — || August 25, 2005 || Palomar || NEAT || — || align=right | 1.3 km || 
|-id=784 bgcolor=#E9E9E9
| 323784 ||  || — || August 25, 2005 || Palomar || NEAT || — || align=right | 1.8 km || 
|-id=785 bgcolor=#E9E9E9
| 323785 ||  || — || August 26, 2005 || Anderson Mesa || LONEOS || — || align=right | 3.0 km || 
|-id=786 bgcolor=#E9E9E9
| 323786 ||  || — || August 27, 2005 || Palomar || NEAT || — || align=right | 2.0 km || 
|-id=787 bgcolor=#E9E9E9
| 323787 ||  || — || August 27, 2005 || Palomar || NEAT || HNA || align=right | 2.1 km || 
|-id=788 bgcolor=#E9E9E9
| 323788 ||  || — || August 27, 2005 || Palomar || NEAT || — || align=right | 1.9 km || 
|-id=789 bgcolor=#E9E9E9
| 323789 ||  || — || August 27, 2005 || Palomar || NEAT || — || align=right | 1.6 km || 
|-id=790 bgcolor=#E9E9E9
| 323790 ||  || — || August 28, 2005 || Kitt Peak || Spacewatch || WIT || align=right | 1.0 km || 
|-id=791 bgcolor=#E9E9E9
| 323791 ||  || — || August 28, 2005 || Kitt Peak || Spacewatch || — || align=right | 1.1 km || 
|-id=792 bgcolor=#E9E9E9
| 323792 ||  || — || August 28, 2005 || Kitt Peak || Spacewatch || — || align=right | 1.6 km || 
|-id=793 bgcolor=#E9E9E9
| 323793 ||  || — || August 29, 2005 || Kitt Peak || Spacewatch || — || align=right | 1.6 km || 
|-id=794 bgcolor=#E9E9E9
| 323794 ||  || — || August 30, 2005 || Kitt Peak || Spacewatch || — || align=right | 3.5 km || 
|-id=795 bgcolor=#fefefe
| 323795 ||  || — || August 27, 2005 || Siding Spring || SSS || H || align=right | 1.1 km || 
|-id=796 bgcolor=#E9E9E9
| 323796 ||  || — || August 30, 2005 || Kitt Peak || Spacewatch || — || align=right | 1.5 km || 
|-id=797 bgcolor=#E9E9E9
| 323797 ||  || — || August 30, 2005 || Kitt Peak || Spacewatch || — || align=right | 2.7 km || 
|-id=798 bgcolor=#E9E9E9
| 323798 ||  || — || August 30, 2005 || Kitt Peak || Spacewatch || — || align=right | 1.1 km || 
|-id=799 bgcolor=#E9E9E9
| 323799 ||  || — || August 31, 2005 || Anderson Mesa || LONEOS || — || align=right | 2.9 km || 
|-id=800 bgcolor=#fefefe
| 323800 ||  || — || August 28, 2005 || Siding Spring || SSS || — || align=right | 1.1 km || 
|}

323801–323900 

|-bgcolor=#E9E9E9
| 323801 ||  || — || August 30, 2005 || Palomar || NEAT || — || align=right | 2.3 km || 
|-id=802 bgcolor=#E9E9E9
| 323802 ||  || — || August 30, 2005 || Palomar || NEAT || GEF || align=right | 1.8 km || 
|-id=803 bgcolor=#E9E9E9
| 323803 ||  || — || August 28, 2005 || Kitt Peak || Spacewatch || MAR || align=right | 1.4 km || 
|-id=804 bgcolor=#E9E9E9
| 323804 ||  || — || August 28, 2005 || Siding Spring || SSS || — || align=right | 2.8 km || 
|-id=805 bgcolor=#E9E9E9
| 323805 ||  || — || August 31, 2005 || Palomar || NEAT || GAL || align=right | 2.4 km || 
|-id=806 bgcolor=#E9E9E9
| 323806 ||  || — || August 29, 2005 || Palomar || NEAT || — || align=right | 1.9 km || 
|-id=807 bgcolor=#E9E9E9
| 323807 ||  || — || August 30, 2005 || Palomar || NEAT || — || align=right | 2.7 km || 
|-id=808 bgcolor=#E9E9E9
| 323808 ||  || — || August 31, 2005 || Kitt Peak || Spacewatch || — || align=right | 2.1 km || 
|-id=809 bgcolor=#fefefe
| 323809 ||  || — || September 8, 2005 || Socorro || LINEAR || H || align=right data-sort-value="0.94" | 940 m || 
|-id=810 bgcolor=#E9E9E9
| 323810 ||  || — || September 1, 2005 || Kitt Peak || Spacewatch || — || align=right data-sort-value="0.89" | 890 m || 
|-id=811 bgcolor=#fefefe
| 323811 ||  || — || September 11, 2005 || Anderson Mesa || LONEOS || H || align=right data-sort-value="0.80" | 800 m || 
|-id=812 bgcolor=#fefefe
| 323812 ||  || — || September 10, 2005 || Anderson Mesa || LONEOS || H || align=right data-sort-value="0.74" | 740 m || 
|-id=813 bgcolor=#fefefe
| 323813 ||  || — || September 11, 2005 || Kitt Peak || Spacewatch || — || align=right | 1.6 km || 
|-id=814 bgcolor=#E9E9E9
| 323814 ||  || — || September 22, 2005 || Palomar || NEAT || GER || align=right | 1.3 km || 
|-id=815 bgcolor=#E9E9E9
| 323815 ||  || — || September 18, 2005 || Palomar || NEAT || — || align=right | 2.7 km || 
|-id=816 bgcolor=#E9E9E9
| 323816 ||  || — || September 23, 2005 || Kitt Peak || Spacewatch || HOF || align=right | 2.7 km || 
|-id=817 bgcolor=#E9E9E9
| 323817 ||  || — || September 23, 2005 || Kitt Peak || Spacewatch || WIT || align=right | 1.2 km || 
|-id=818 bgcolor=#E9E9E9
| 323818 ||  || — || September 26, 2005 || Kitt Peak || Spacewatch || — || align=right | 2.1 km || 
|-id=819 bgcolor=#E9E9E9
| 323819 ||  || — || September 26, 2005 || Kitt Peak || Spacewatch || — || align=right | 2.0 km || 
|-id=820 bgcolor=#E9E9E9
| 323820 ||  || — || September 23, 2005 || Kitt Peak || Spacewatch || — || align=right | 1.8 km || 
|-id=821 bgcolor=#E9E9E9
| 323821 ||  || — || September 23, 2005 || Catalina || CSS || EUN || align=right | 1.5 km || 
|-id=822 bgcolor=#E9E9E9
| 323822 ||  || — || September 23, 2005 || Kitt Peak || Spacewatch || — || align=right | 2.7 km || 
|-id=823 bgcolor=#E9E9E9
| 323823 ||  || — || September 23, 2005 || Kitt Peak || Spacewatch || — || align=right data-sort-value="0.93" | 930 m || 
|-id=824 bgcolor=#E9E9E9
| 323824 ||  || — || September 24, 2005 || Kitt Peak || Spacewatch || — || align=right | 2.0 km || 
|-id=825 bgcolor=#E9E9E9
| 323825 ||  || — || September 24, 2005 || Kitt Peak || Spacewatch || — || align=right | 1.7 km || 
|-id=826 bgcolor=#E9E9E9
| 323826 ||  || — || September 24, 2005 || Kitt Peak || Spacewatch || WIT || align=right | 1.0 km || 
|-id=827 bgcolor=#E9E9E9
| 323827 ||  || — || September 24, 2005 || Kitt Peak || Spacewatch || — || align=right | 1.7 km || 
|-id=828 bgcolor=#fefefe
| 323828 ||  || — || September 24, 2005 || Kitt Peak || Spacewatch || H || align=right data-sort-value="0.48" | 480 m || 
|-id=829 bgcolor=#E9E9E9
| 323829 ||  || — || September 24, 2005 || Kitt Peak || Spacewatch || — || align=right | 1.7 km || 
|-id=830 bgcolor=#E9E9E9
| 323830 ||  || — || September 24, 2005 || Kitt Peak || Spacewatch || — || align=right | 1.7 km || 
|-id=831 bgcolor=#E9E9E9
| 323831 ||  || — || September 24, 2005 || Kitt Peak || Spacewatch || — || align=right | 2.5 km || 
|-id=832 bgcolor=#E9E9E9
| 323832 ||  || — || September 24, 2005 || Kitt Peak || Spacewatch || — || align=right | 2.1 km || 
|-id=833 bgcolor=#E9E9E9
| 323833 ||  || — || September 24, 2005 || Kitt Peak || Spacewatch || KON || align=right | 2.6 km || 
|-id=834 bgcolor=#E9E9E9
| 323834 ||  || — || September 25, 2005 || Kitt Peak || Spacewatch || — || align=right | 2.3 km || 
|-id=835 bgcolor=#E9E9E9
| 323835 ||  || — || September 26, 2005 || Goodricke-Pigott || R. A. Tucker || — || align=right | 2.5 km || 
|-id=836 bgcolor=#E9E9E9
| 323836 ||  || — || September 26, 2005 || Kitt Peak || Spacewatch || — || align=right | 1.9 km || 
|-id=837 bgcolor=#E9E9E9
| 323837 ||  || — || September 26, 2005 || Kitt Peak || Spacewatch || — || align=right | 1.6 km || 
|-id=838 bgcolor=#E9E9E9
| 323838 ||  || — || September 26, 2005 || Palomar || NEAT || — || align=right | 2.9 km || 
|-id=839 bgcolor=#E9E9E9
| 323839 ||  || — || September 27, 2005 || Kitt Peak || Spacewatch || AEO || align=right | 1.4 km || 
|-id=840 bgcolor=#d6d6d6
| 323840 ||  || — || September 24, 2005 || Kitt Peak || Spacewatch || — || align=right | 2.3 km || 
|-id=841 bgcolor=#E9E9E9
| 323841 ||  || — || September 24, 2005 || Kitt Peak || Spacewatch || — || align=right | 1.6 km || 
|-id=842 bgcolor=#fefefe
| 323842 ||  || — || September 24, 2005 || Kitt Peak || Spacewatch || — || align=right data-sort-value="0.84" | 840 m || 
|-id=843 bgcolor=#E9E9E9
| 323843 ||  || — || September 24, 2005 || Kitt Peak || Spacewatch || MAR || align=right data-sort-value="0.96" | 960 m || 
|-id=844 bgcolor=#E9E9E9
| 323844 ||  || — || September 24, 2005 || Kitt Peak || Spacewatch || — || align=right | 2.2 km || 
|-id=845 bgcolor=#E9E9E9
| 323845 ||  || — || September 24, 2005 || Kitt Peak || Spacewatch || — || align=right | 2.3 km || 
|-id=846 bgcolor=#E9E9E9
| 323846 ||  || — || September 24, 2005 || Kitt Peak || Spacewatch || — || align=right | 1.6 km || 
|-id=847 bgcolor=#E9E9E9
| 323847 ||  || — || September 24, 2005 || Kitt Peak || Spacewatch || NEM || align=right | 2.5 km || 
|-id=848 bgcolor=#E9E9E9
| 323848 ||  || — || September 24, 2005 || Kitt Peak || Spacewatch || HEN || align=right | 1.2 km || 
|-id=849 bgcolor=#E9E9E9
| 323849 ||  || — || September 24, 2005 || Kitt Peak || Spacewatch || — || align=right | 2.2 km || 
|-id=850 bgcolor=#E9E9E9
| 323850 ||  || — || September 25, 2005 || Palomar || NEAT || EUN || align=right | 1.2 km || 
|-id=851 bgcolor=#E9E9E9
| 323851 ||  || — || September 25, 2005 || Kitt Peak || Spacewatch || — || align=right | 1.8 km || 
|-id=852 bgcolor=#E9E9E9
| 323852 ||  || — || September 25, 2005 || Kitt Peak || Spacewatch || HOF || align=right | 2.6 km || 
|-id=853 bgcolor=#E9E9E9
| 323853 ||  || — || September 26, 2005 || Kitt Peak || Spacewatch || HOF || align=right | 2.5 km || 
|-id=854 bgcolor=#E9E9E9
| 323854 ||  || — || September 26, 2005 || Kitt Peak || Spacewatch || — || align=right | 1.0 km || 
|-id=855 bgcolor=#fefefe
| 323855 ||  || — || September 27, 2005 || Palomar || NEAT || H || align=right data-sort-value="0.68" | 680 m || 
|-id=856 bgcolor=#E9E9E9
| 323856 ||  || — || September 28, 2005 || Palomar || NEAT || GEF || align=right | 1.6 km || 
|-id=857 bgcolor=#E9E9E9
| 323857 ||  || — || September 29, 2005 || Anderson Mesa || LONEOS || — || align=right | 2.5 km || 
|-id=858 bgcolor=#E9E9E9
| 323858 ||  || — || September 29, 2005 || Anderson Mesa || LONEOS || ADE || align=right | 1.9 km || 
|-id=859 bgcolor=#E9E9E9
| 323859 ||  || — || September 29, 2005 || Mount Lemmon || Mount Lemmon Survey || — || align=right | 1.7 km || 
|-id=860 bgcolor=#E9E9E9
| 323860 ||  || — || September 29, 2005 || Mount Lemmon || Mount Lemmon Survey || HNS || align=right | 1.4 km || 
|-id=861 bgcolor=#E9E9E9
| 323861 ||  || — || September 25, 2005 || Kitt Peak || Spacewatch || KON || align=right | 3.5 km || 
|-id=862 bgcolor=#E9E9E9
| 323862 ||  || — || September 25, 2005 || Kitt Peak || Spacewatch || — || align=right | 1.1 km || 
|-id=863 bgcolor=#E9E9E9
| 323863 ||  || — || September 25, 2005 || Kitt Peak || Spacewatch || — || align=right | 1.1 km || 
|-id=864 bgcolor=#E9E9E9
| 323864 ||  || — || September 25, 2005 || Kitt Peak || Spacewatch || — || align=right | 1.7 km || 
|-id=865 bgcolor=#E9E9E9
| 323865 ||  || — || September 26, 2005 || Kitt Peak || Spacewatch || — || align=right | 1.6 km || 
|-id=866 bgcolor=#E9E9E9
| 323866 ||  || — || September 26, 2005 || Catalina || CSS || — || align=right | 2.9 km || 
|-id=867 bgcolor=#E9E9E9
| 323867 ||  || — || September 26, 2005 || Kitt Peak || Spacewatch || NEM || align=right | 2.1 km || 
|-id=868 bgcolor=#E9E9E9
| 323868 ||  || — || September 26, 2005 || Catalina || CSS || — || align=right | 4.4 km || 
|-id=869 bgcolor=#E9E9E9
| 323869 ||  || — || September 27, 2005 || Kitt Peak || Spacewatch || MIS || align=right | 2.9 km || 
|-id=870 bgcolor=#E9E9E9
| 323870 ||  || — || September 27, 2005 || Kitt Peak || Spacewatch || HEN || align=right data-sort-value="0.91" | 910 m || 
|-id=871 bgcolor=#E9E9E9
| 323871 ||  || — || September 27, 2005 || Kitt Peak || Spacewatch || — || align=right | 2.4 km || 
|-id=872 bgcolor=#E9E9E9
| 323872 ||  || — || September 28, 2005 || Palomar || NEAT || GAL || align=right | 2.3 km || 
|-id=873 bgcolor=#E9E9E9
| 323873 ||  || — || September 29, 2005 || Palomar || NEAT || EUN || align=right | 1.9 km || 
|-id=874 bgcolor=#E9E9E9
| 323874 ||  || — || September 29, 2005 || Kitt Peak || Spacewatch || HOF || align=right | 2.5 km || 
|-id=875 bgcolor=#E9E9E9
| 323875 ||  || — || September 29, 2005 || Kitt Peak || Spacewatch || — || align=right | 2.1 km || 
|-id=876 bgcolor=#E9E9E9
| 323876 ||  || — || September 29, 2005 || Kitt Peak || Spacewatch || — || align=right | 2.0 km || 
|-id=877 bgcolor=#E9E9E9
| 323877 ||  || — || September 29, 2005 || Kitt Peak || Spacewatch || WIT || align=right data-sort-value="0.99" | 990 m || 
|-id=878 bgcolor=#E9E9E9
| 323878 ||  || — || September 29, 2005 || Kitt Peak || Spacewatch || HEN || align=right data-sort-value="0.89" | 890 m || 
|-id=879 bgcolor=#E9E9E9
| 323879 ||  || — || September 30, 2005 || Mount Lemmon || Mount Lemmon Survey || MAR || align=right | 1.1 km || 
|-id=880 bgcolor=#E9E9E9
| 323880 ||  || — || September 30, 2005 || Anderson Mesa || LONEOS || — || align=right | 3.5 km || 
|-id=881 bgcolor=#E9E9E9
| 323881 ||  || — || September 30, 2005 || Anderson Mesa || LONEOS || MRX || align=right | 1.5 km || 
|-id=882 bgcolor=#E9E9E9
| 323882 ||  || — || September 29, 2005 || Catalina || CSS || — || align=right | 2.5 km || 
|-id=883 bgcolor=#E9E9E9
| 323883 ||  || — || September 30, 2005 || Kitt Peak || Spacewatch || — || align=right | 2.6 km || 
|-id=884 bgcolor=#E9E9E9
| 323884 ||  || — || September 29, 2005 || Kitt Peak || Spacewatch || — || align=right | 2.1 km || 
|-id=885 bgcolor=#E9E9E9
| 323885 ||  || — || September 29, 2005 || Kitt Peak || Spacewatch || WIT || align=right data-sort-value="0.94" | 940 m || 
|-id=886 bgcolor=#E9E9E9
| 323886 ||  || — || September 30, 2005 || Kitt Peak || Spacewatch || ADE || align=right | 2.6 km || 
|-id=887 bgcolor=#E9E9E9
| 323887 ||  || — || September 30, 2005 || Palomar || NEAT || — || align=right | 2.5 km || 
|-id=888 bgcolor=#E9E9E9
| 323888 ||  || — || September 30, 2005 || Mount Lemmon || Mount Lemmon Survey || EUN || align=right | 1.3 km || 
|-id=889 bgcolor=#E9E9E9
| 323889 ||  || — || September 30, 2005 || Kitt Peak || Spacewatch || — || align=right | 2.4 km || 
|-id=890 bgcolor=#E9E9E9
| 323890 ||  || — || September 30, 2005 || Kitt Peak || Spacewatch || — || align=right | 2.1 km || 
|-id=891 bgcolor=#d6d6d6
| 323891 ||  || — || September 22, 2005 || Palomar || NEAT || — || align=right | 2.4 km || 
|-id=892 bgcolor=#E9E9E9
| 323892 ||  || — || September 29, 2005 || Kitt Peak || Spacewatch || — || align=right | 1.9 km || 
|-id=893 bgcolor=#E9E9E9
| 323893 ||  || — || September 24, 2005 || Kitt Peak || Spacewatch || — || align=right | 1.7 km || 
|-id=894 bgcolor=#d6d6d6
| 323894 ||  || — || September 26, 2005 || Apache Point || A. C. Becker || BRA || align=right | 1.7 km || 
|-id=895 bgcolor=#E9E9E9
| 323895 ||  || — || September 26, 2005 || Apache Point || A. C. Becker || — || align=right | 3.0 km || 
|-id=896 bgcolor=#E9E9E9
| 323896 ||  || — || September 30, 2005 || Anderson Mesa || LONEOS || HNS || align=right | 1.6 km || 
|-id=897 bgcolor=#E9E9E9
| 323897 ||  || — || October 1, 2005 || Socorro || LINEAR || MAR || align=right | 1.4 km || 
|-id=898 bgcolor=#E9E9E9
| 323898 ||  || — || October 1, 2005 || Catalina || CSS || — || align=right | 2.2 km || 
|-id=899 bgcolor=#E9E9E9
| 323899 ||  || — || October 1, 2005 || Mount Lemmon || Mount Lemmon Survey || MRX || align=right | 1.1 km || 
|-id=900 bgcolor=#E9E9E9
| 323900 ||  || — || October 2, 2005 || Palomar || NEAT || — || align=right | 2.8 km || 
|}

323901–324000 

|-bgcolor=#E9E9E9
| 323901 ||  || — || October 1, 2005 || Kitt Peak || Spacewatch || MIS || align=right | 2.8 km || 
|-id=902 bgcolor=#E9E9E9
| 323902 ||  || — || October 1, 2005 || Mount Lemmon || Mount Lemmon Survey || — || align=right | 1.8 km || 
|-id=903 bgcolor=#E9E9E9
| 323903 ||  || — || October 1, 2005 || Mount Lemmon || Mount Lemmon Survey || AGN || align=right | 1.1 km || 
|-id=904 bgcolor=#d6d6d6
| 323904 ||  || — || October 1, 2005 || Mount Lemmon || Mount Lemmon Survey || — || align=right | 2.8 km || 
|-id=905 bgcolor=#E9E9E9
| 323905 ||  || — || September 25, 2005 || Palomar || NEAT || — || align=right | 2.5 km || 
|-id=906 bgcolor=#E9E9E9
| 323906 ||  || — || October 1, 2005 || Kitt Peak || Spacewatch || — || align=right | 1.2 km || 
|-id=907 bgcolor=#E9E9E9
| 323907 ||  || — || October 1, 2005 || Catalina || CSS || — || align=right | 1.8 km || 
|-id=908 bgcolor=#E9E9E9
| 323908 ||  || — || October 3, 2005 || Kitt Peak || Spacewatch || — || align=right | 2.5 km || 
|-id=909 bgcolor=#E9E9E9
| 323909 ||  || — || October 6, 2005 || Kitt Peak || Spacewatch || HNS || align=right | 1.4 km || 
|-id=910 bgcolor=#E9E9E9
| 323910 ||  || — || October 7, 2005 || Anderson Mesa || LONEOS || — || align=right | 3.4 km || 
|-id=911 bgcolor=#E9E9E9
| 323911 ||  || — || October 2, 2005 || Catalina || CSS || — || align=right | 2.9 km || 
|-id=912 bgcolor=#E9E9E9
| 323912 ||  || — || October 7, 2005 || Mount Lemmon || Mount Lemmon Survey || — || align=right | 1.7 km || 
|-id=913 bgcolor=#E9E9E9
| 323913 ||  || — || October 8, 2005 || Catalina || CSS || GEF || align=right | 1.3 km || 
|-id=914 bgcolor=#E9E9E9
| 323914 ||  || — || October 3, 2005 || Kitt Peak || Spacewatch || — || align=right | 1.8 km || 
|-id=915 bgcolor=#E9E9E9
| 323915 ||  || — || October 3, 2005 || Kitt Peak || Spacewatch || — || align=right | 1.8 km || 
|-id=916 bgcolor=#E9E9E9
| 323916 ||  || — || October 3, 2005 || Kitt Peak || Spacewatch || — || align=right | 1.6 km || 
|-id=917 bgcolor=#E9E9E9
| 323917 ||  || — || September 24, 2005 || Kitt Peak || Spacewatch || — || align=right | 2.5 km || 
|-id=918 bgcolor=#E9E9E9
| 323918 ||  || — || October 3, 2005 || Kitt Peak || Spacewatch || — || align=right | 1.8 km || 
|-id=919 bgcolor=#E9E9E9
| 323919 ||  || — || October 5, 2005 || Catalina || CSS || — || align=right | 1.8 km || 
|-id=920 bgcolor=#E9E9E9
| 323920 ||  || — || October 6, 2005 || Mount Lemmon || Mount Lemmon Survey || — || align=right | 2.4 km || 
|-id=921 bgcolor=#E9E9E9
| 323921 ||  || — || October 6, 2005 || Mount Lemmon || Mount Lemmon Survey || — || align=right | 2.3 km || 
|-id=922 bgcolor=#E9E9E9
| 323922 ||  || — || October 6, 2005 || Mount Lemmon || Mount Lemmon Survey || PAD || align=right | 1.8 km || 
|-id=923 bgcolor=#E9E9E9
| 323923 ||  || — || October 7, 2005 || Catalina || CSS || — || align=right | 3.7 km || 
|-id=924 bgcolor=#E9E9E9
| 323924 ||  || — || October 8, 2005 || Socorro || LINEAR || — || align=right | 3.2 km || 
|-id=925 bgcolor=#E9E9E9
| 323925 ||  || — || October 9, 2005 || Kitt Peak || Spacewatch || — || align=right | 1.6 km || 
|-id=926 bgcolor=#E9E9E9
| 323926 ||  || — || October 7, 2005 || Kitt Peak || Spacewatch || PAD || align=right | 1.8 km || 
|-id=927 bgcolor=#E9E9E9
| 323927 ||  || — || October 7, 2005 || Kitt Peak || Spacewatch || MRX || align=right data-sort-value="0.97" | 970 m || 
|-id=928 bgcolor=#E9E9E9
| 323928 ||  || — || October 7, 2005 || Kitt Peak || Spacewatch || HOF || align=right | 3.3 km || 
|-id=929 bgcolor=#E9E9E9
| 323929 ||  || — || October 7, 2005 || Kitt Peak || Spacewatch || — || align=right | 1.5 km || 
|-id=930 bgcolor=#E9E9E9
| 323930 ||  || — || October 10, 2005 || Kitt Peak || Spacewatch || WIT || align=right | 1.2 km || 
|-id=931 bgcolor=#E9E9E9
| 323931 ||  || — || October 6, 2005 || Kitt Peak || Spacewatch || — || align=right | 2.7 km || 
|-id=932 bgcolor=#E9E9E9
| 323932 ||  || — || October 8, 2005 || Kitt Peak || Spacewatch || — || align=right | 3.1 km || 
|-id=933 bgcolor=#E9E9E9
| 323933 ||  || — || October 9, 2005 || Kitt Peak || Spacewatch || — || align=right | 2.3 km || 
|-id=934 bgcolor=#E9E9E9
| 323934 ||  || — || October 9, 2005 || Kitt Peak || Spacewatch || — || align=right | 3.0 km || 
|-id=935 bgcolor=#E9E9E9
| 323935 ||  || — || October 9, 2005 || Kitt Peak || Spacewatch || — || align=right data-sort-value="0.81" | 810 m || 
|-id=936 bgcolor=#E9E9E9
| 323936 ||  || — || October 5, 2005 || Kitt Peak || Spacewatch || — || align=right | 1.8 km || 
|-id=937 bgcolor=#E9E9E9
| 323937 ||  || — || October 9, 2005 || Kitt Peak || Spacewatch || — || align=right | 1.3 km || 
|-id=938 bgcolor=#E9E9E9
| 323938 ||  || — || October 3, 2005 || Kitt Peak || Spacewatch || — || align=right | 1.3 km || 
|-id=939 bgcolor=#E9E9E9
| 323939 ||  || — || October 1, 2005 || Kitt Peak || Spacewatch || — || align=right | 1.3 km || 
|-id=940 bgcolor=#E9E9E9
| 323940 ||  || — || October 5, 2005 || Kitt Peak || Spacewatch || — || align=right | 2.8 km || 
|-id=941 bgcolor=#E9E9E9
| 323941 ||  || — || October 22, 2005 || Kitt Peak || Spacewatch || AGN || align=right | 1.1 km || 
|-id=942 bgcolor=#E9E9E9
| 323942 ||  || — || October 22, 2005 || Kitt Peak || Spacewatch || — || align=right | 2.2 km || 
|-id=943 bgcolor=#d6d6d6
| 323943 ||  || — || October 22, 2005 || Kitt Peak || Spacewatch || — || align=right | 3.8 km || 
|-id=944 bgcolor=#E9E9E9
| 323944 ||  || — || October 22, 2005 || Catalina || CSS || AGN || align=right | 1.3 km || 
|-id=945 bgcolor=#E9E9E9
| 323945 ||  || — || October 23, 2005 || Kitt Peak || Spacewatch || HOF || align=right | 2.7 km || 
|-id=946 bgcolor=#E9E9E9
| 323946 ||  || — || October 23, 2005 || Kitt Peak || Spacewatch || — || align=right | 1.4 km || 
|-id=947 bgcolor=#E9E9E9
| 323947 ||  || — || October 23, 2005 || Catalina || CSS || GEF || align=right | 1.8 km || 
|-id=948 bgcolor=#d6d6d6
| 323948 ||  || — || October 12, 2005 || Kitt Peak || Spacewatch || K-2 || align=right | 1.5 km || 
|-id=949 bgcolor=#E9E9E9
| 323949 ||  || — || October 24, 2005 || Kitt Peak || Spacewatch || — || align=right | 2.6 km || 
|-id=950 bgcolor=#E9E9E9
| 323950 ||  || — || October 24, 2005 || Kitt Peak || Spacewatch || — || align=right | 2.5 km || 
|-id=951 bgcolor=#E9E9E9
| 323951 ||  || — || October 24, 2005 || Kitt Peak || Spacewatch || AST || align=right | 1.9 km || 
|-id=952 bgcolor=#E9E9E9
| 323952 ||  || — || October 22, 2005 || Kitt Peak || Spacewatch || — || align=right | 3.1 km || 
|-id=953 bgcolor=#E9E9E9
| 323953 ||  || — || October 22, 2005 || Catalina || CSS || AER || align=right | 1.8 km || 
|-id=954 bgcolor=#d6d6d6
| 323954 ||  || — || October 22, 2005 || Catalina || CSS || — || align=right | 2.4 km || 
|-id=955 bgcolor=#E9E9E9
| 323955 ||  || — || October 22, 2005 || Kitt Peak || Spacewatch || HEN || align=right | 1.1 km || 
|-id=956 bgcolor=#E9E9E9
| 323956 ||  || — || October 23, 2005 || Catalina || CSS || — || align=right | 2.8 km || 
|-id=957 bgcolor=#d6d6d6
| 323957 ||  || — || October 23, 2005 || Catalina || CSS || — || align=right | 3.2 km || 
|-id=958 bgcolor=#E9E9E9
| 323958 ||  || — || October 25, 2005 || Mount Lemmon || Mount Lemmon Survey || HEN || align=right | 1.2 km || 
|-id=959 bgcolor=#E9E9E9
| 323959 ||  || — || October 25, 2005 || Mount Lemmon || Mount Lemmon Survey || MRX || align=right | 1.1 km || 
|-id=960 bgcolor=#E9E9E9
| 323960 ||  || — || October 23, 2005 || Palomar || NEAT || HOF || align=right | 3.0 km || 
|-id=961 bgcolor=#d6d6d6
| 323961 ||  || — || October 22, 2005 || Kitt Peak || Spacewatch || — || align=right | 2.3 km || 
|-id=962 bgcolor=#d6d6d6
| 323962 ||  || — || October 22, 2005 || Kitt Peak || Spacewatch || CHA || align=right | 2.4 km || 
|-id=963 bgcolor=#E9E9E9
| 323963 ||  || — || October 22, 2005 || Kitt Peak || Spacewatch || GEF || align=right | 1.4 km || 
|-id=964 bgcolor=#E9E9E9
| 323964 ||  || — || October 22, 2005 || Kitt Peak || Spacewatch || WIT || align=right | 1.1 km || 
|-id=965 bgcolor=#E9E9E9
| 323965 ||  || — || October 22, 2005 || Kitt Peak || Spacewatch || — || align=right | 2.3 km || 
|-id=966 bgcolor=#E9E9E9
| 323966 ||  || — || October 22, 2005 || Kitt Peak || Spacewatch || — || align=right | 2.6 km || 
|-id=967 bgcolor=#E9E9E9
| 323967 ||  || — || October 22, 2005 || Kitt Peak || Spacewatch || HOF || align=right | 3.1 km || 
|-id=968 bgcolor=#E9E9E9
| 323968 ||  || — || October 22, 2005 || Kitt Peak || Spacewatch || — || align=right | 2.0 km || 
|-id=969 bgcolor=#E9E9E9
| 323969 ||  || — || October 22, 2005 || Kitt Peak || Spacewatch || — || align=right | 2.8 km || 
|-id=970 bgcolor=#E9E9E9
| 323970 ||  || — || October 22, 2005 || Kitt Peak || Spacewatch || AGN || align=right | 1.3 km || 
|-id=971 bgcolor=#E9E9E9
| 323971 ||  || — || October 22, 2005 || Kitt Peak || Spacewatch || — || align=right | 2.2 km || 
|-id=972 bgcolor=#E9E9E9
| 323972 ||  || — || October 23, 2005 || Palomar || NEAT || GEF || align=right | 1.7 km || 
|-id=973 bgcolor=#E9E9E9
| 323973 ||  || — || October 24, 2005 || Kitt Peak || Spacewatch || — || align=right | 3.3 km || 
|-id=974 bgcolor=#d6d6d6
| 323974 ||  || — || October 24, 2005 || Kitt Peak || Spacewatch || 628 || align=right | 1.7 km || 
|-id=975 bgcolor=#E9E9E9
| 323975 ||  || — || October 25, 2005 || Kitt Peak || Spacewatch || — || align=right | 2.4 km || 
|-id=976 bgcolor=#E9E9E9
| 323976 ||  || — || October 26, 2005 || Kitt Peak || Spacewatch || — || align=right | 3.3 km || 
|-id=977 bgcolor=#E9E9E9
| 323977 ||  || — || October 26, 2005 || Kitt Peak || Spacewatch || AGN || align=right | 1.6 km || 
|-id=978 bgcolor=#E9E9E9
| 323978 ||  || — || October 26, 2005 || Kitt Peak || Spacewatch || GEF || align=right | 1.2 km || 
|-id=979 bgcolor=#E9E9E9
| 323979 ||  || — || October 26, 2005 || Kitt Peak || Spacewatch || — || align=right | 2.3 km || 
|-id=980 bgcolor=#E9E9E9
| 323980 ||  || — || October 26, 2005 || Mount Lemmon || Mount Lemmon Survey || — || align=right | 3.0 km || 
|-id=981 bgcolor=#E9E9E9
| 323981 ||  || — || October 26, 2005 || Kitt Peak || Spacewatch || AGN || align=right | 1.3 km || 
|-id=982 bgcolor=#E9E9E9
| 323982 ||  || — || October 24, 2005 || Kitt Peak || Spacewatch || — || align=right | 1.7 km || 
|-id=983 bgcolor=#E9E9E9
| 323983 ||  || — || October 24, 2005 || Kitt Peak || Spacewatch || — || align=right | 2.9 km || 
|-id=984 bgcolor=#d6d6d6
| 323984 ||  || — || October 24, 2005 || Kitt Peak || Spacewatch || KOR || align=right | 1.4 km || 
|-id=985 bgcolor=#E9E9E9
| 323985 ||  || — || October 27, 2005 || Mount Lemmon || Mount Lemmon Survey || — || align=right | 1.6 km || 
|-id=986 bgcolor=#d6d6d6
| 323986 ||  || — || October 27, 2005 || Mount Lemmon || Mount Lemmon Survey || KOR || align=right | 1.4 km || 
|-id=987 bgcolor=#E9E9E9
| 323987 ||  || — || October 25, 2005 || Mount Lemmon || Mount Lemmon Survey || — || align=right | 1.9 km || 
|-id=988 bgcolor=#E9E9E9
| 323988 ||  || — || October 25, 2005 || Kitt Peak || Spacewatch || — || align=right | 2.1 km || 
|-id=989 bgcolor=#E9E9E9
| 323989 ||  || — || October 25, 2005 || Mount Lemmon || Mount Lemmon Survey || AST || align=right | 2.1 km || 
|-id=990 bgcolor=#d6d6d6
| 323990 ||  || — || October 28, 2005 || Mount Lemmon || Mount Lemmon Survey || — || align=right | 2.4 km || 
|-id=991 bgcolor=#E9E9E9
| 323991 ||  || — || October 25, 2005 || Kitt Peak || Spacewatch || WIT || align=right | 1.4 km || 
|-id=992 bgcolor=#E9E9E9
| 323992 ||  || — || October 25, 2005 || Kitt Peak || Spacewatch || — || align=right | 2.5 km || 
|-id=993 bgcolor=#E9E9E9
| 323993 ||  || — || October 25, 2005 || Mount Lemmon || Mount Lemmon Survey || AGN || align=right | 1.5 km || 
|-id=994 bgcolor=#E9E9E9
| 323994 ||  || — || October 25, 2005 || Kitt Peak || Spacewatch || — || align=right | 2.8 km || 
|-id=995 bgcolor=#E9E9E9
| 323995 ||  || — || October 25, 2005 || Kitt Peak || Spacewatch || — || align=right | 3.1 km || 
|-id=996 bgcolor=#E9E9E9
| 323996 ||  || — || October 25, 2005 || Kitt Peak || Spacewatch || NEM || align=right | 2.6 km || 
|-id=997 bgcolor=#d6d6d6
| 323997 ||  || — || October 25, 2005 || Kitt Peak || Spacewatch || CHA || align=right | 2.7 km || 
|-id=998 bgcolor=#E9E9E9
| 323998 ||  || — || October 25, 2005 || Kitt Peak || Spacewatch || — || align=right | 2.1 km || 
|-id=999 bgcolor=#E9E9E9
| 323999 ||  || — || October 28, 2005 || Mount Lemmon || Mount Lemmon Survey || — || align=right | 2.5 km || 
|-id=000 bgcolor=#E9E9E9
| 324000 ||  || — || October 23, 2005 || Catalina || CSS || — || align=right | 2.8 km || 
|}

References

External links 
 Discovery Circumstances: Numbered Minor Planets (320001)–(325000) (IAU Minor Planet Center)

0323